= List of projects funded by Wave Energy Scotland =

This page lists the projects funded by Wave Energy Scotland. These calls have been organised into six topics, mostly with three stages (1-3).

- Power Take-Off (PTO)
- Novel Wave Energy Converter (NWEC)
- Structural Materials and Manufacturing Processes (SMMP)
- Control Systems (CS)
- Quick Connection Systems (QCS)
- Direct Generation (DG)

Note that the projects listed below are listed by the date awarded then alphabetically, not in any order of priority.

Date	Call	Project name	Project partners	Contract value	Status
30 Jul 2015	PTO Stage 1	Advanced Hydraulic-electric Power Take Off (AHPTO)	Nova Innovation, Aquamarine Power, Siemens	£89,929	
30 Jul 2015	PTO Stage 1	Direct contact dielectric elastomer PTO for submerged wave energy converters	Scuola Superiore di Studi Uniersitari e di Perfezionamento Sant'Anna (SSSA), University of Edinburgh, Universita di Bologna	£96,000	Progressed to Stage 2
30 Jul 2015	PTO Stage 1	Edinburgh Designs Adaptive Power Take Off (EDAPTO)	Edinburgh Designs	£78,090	
30 Jul 2015	PTO Stage 1	New Electric Automotive Power Extraction Device (NEAPED)	Marine Design International (MDI), 4c Design	£79,400	
30 Jul 2015	PTO Stage 1	Power Electronic Controlled Magnet Gear (PECMAG)	Ecosse Subsea Systems, Bathwick Electrical Design Ltd, Pure Marine Ltd, Supply Design Ltd.	£100,000	Progressed to Stage 2
30 Jul 2015	PTO Stage 1	Power Sharing Transmission based Bi-directional to Uni-directional PTO (PST-PTO)	Cofely Fabricom, Ghent University	£99,990	
30 Jul 2015	PTO Stage 1	Survivable and Efficient OLeo-hydraulic assisted power TAke-off (SEÒLTA)	TECNALIA Research & Innovation, OCEANTEC Energías Marinas S.L.	£87,271	
30 Jul 2015	PTO Stage 1	Wave Energy Transmission Module	Romax Technology Ltd, Sea Power Ltd, Limerick Wave & Pure Marine Gen	£100,000	Progressed to Stage 2
30 Jul 2015	PTO Stage 1	'WEC-Direct' - The application of a direct drive, contra-rotating generator to wave energy converters	Energy Systems Research Unit University of Strathclyde, Nautricity Ltd	£99,128	
30 Jul 2015	PTO Stage 2 (direct)	C-GEN Direct Drive PTO	University of Edinburgh, University of Strathclyde, NGenTec Ltd, Fountain Design Ltd.	£467,785	
30 Jul 2015	PTO Stage 2 (direct)	Hybrid Digital Displacement® hydraulic PTO for wave energy	Artemis Intelligent Power Ltd., Quoceant Ltd.	£499,997	
30 Jul 2015	PTO Stage 2 (direct)	ReBaS Generator (Reciprocating Ball Screw Generator)	UMBRA Cuscinetti S.p.A., Hebrides Marine Services Ltd, SEAPOWER scrl [Consortium with University of Naples Federico II]	£440,348	
30 Jul 2015	PTO Stage 2 (direct)	Blue Power Take Off	Blue Power Energy Ltd., Energy Technology Centre Ltd.	£306,530	
30 Jul 2015	PTO Stage 2 (direct)	Concept Optimisation of a Variable Damping Linear Power Take Off	Oscilla Power Ltd., Oscilla Power, Inc. (USA), EMEC (UK)	£499,998	
30 Jul 2015	PTO Stage 3 (direct)	HiDrive - A direct drive PTO for resonant Wave Energy Converters	CorPower Ocean, Iberdrola Engineer & Construction, EMEC & University of Edinburgh	£1,893,461	
2 Nov 2015	NWEC Stage 1	Attenuator Cost of Energy Reduction (ACER)	4C Engineering, Sea Power Ltd	£300,000	Progressed to Stage 2
2 Nov 2015	NWEC Stage 1	WaveTrain Sloped Pneumatic WEC	Joules Energy Efficiency Services Ltd	£291,039	
2 Nov 2015	NWEC Stage 1	WaveNET Series 12	Albatern Ltd	£259,867	
2 Nov 2015	NWEC Stage 1	Mocean Wave Energy Converter	Mocean Energy Ltd, The University of Edinburgh	£299,491	Progressed to Stage 2
2 Nov 2015	NWEC Stage 1	CCell Mark 3 – Novel Curved WEC Optimisation	Zyba Limited, The University of Bath	£252,024.88	
2 Nov 2015	NWEC Stage 1	AISV - Automatically Inflatable and Stowable Volume for step reduction in WEC cost of energy	Quoceant Ltd	£300,000	
2 Nov 2015	NWEC Stage 1	Anaconda Novel Wave Energy Converter	Checkmate Seaenergy Ltd	£271,012	Progressed to Stage 2
2 Nov 2015	NWEC Stage 1	Advanced Archimedes Waveswing	AWS Ocean Energy Ltd	£284,853	Progressed to Stage 2
21 Sep 2016	PTO Stage 2	Wave Energy Transmission Module	Romax Technology Limited, Sea Power Limited and FloWave TT	£496,200	
21 Sep 2016	PTO Stage 2	Power Electronic Controlled Magnet Gear (PECMAG)	Ecosse Sub-sea Systems Ltd, Supply Design Ltd Bathwick Electrical Design Ltd, Pure Marine Gen Ltd	£498,420	
21 Sep 2016	PTO Stage 2	Inflatable Dielectric Elastomer Generator – PTO	Scuola Superiore di Studi Universitari e di Perfezionamento Sant’Anna, University of Edinburgh, Università di Bologna, and Cheros Srl	£498,000	
21 Sep 2016	PTO Stage 2	GATOR Stage 2 - a compliant seal free hydraulic PTO	Exceedence Ltd, Technology from Ideas Ltd, Pelagic Innovation Ltd, University of Strathclyde, and University College Cork	£495,000	
10 Jan 2017	SMMP Stage 1	Hydrocomp	CorPower Ocean, Balmoral Offshore Engineering, Wave Venture	£248,600	Progressed to Stage 2
10 Jan 2017	SMMP Stage 1	Reinforced polymers for Wave EneRgy	Cruz Acheson Consulting Engineers Lda, Carnegie Wave Energy, CorPower Ocean, Arup Consulting Engineers, DNV-GL, National Composites Centre	£249,614	
10 Jan 2017	SMMP Stage 1	Advanced Rotational Moulding for Ocean Renewables (ARMOR)	Haydale Composite Solutions Ltd, Crompton Moulding Ltd., Wave Venture, Carbon Trust	£249,762	
10 Jan 2017	SMMP Stage 1	Concrete as a Technology Enabler (CREATE)	Ove Arup & Partners, Cruz Atcheson Consulting Engineers, MPA: The Concrete Centre, MPA British precast, SeaPower Ltd., Wello OY	£250,000	Progressed to Stage 2
10 Jan 2017	SMMP Stage 1	Advanced Rotational Moulding for Wave Energy Technologies (ARMWET)	Polygen Ltd., Wave Venture, Rototek Ltd.	£209,000	
10 Jan 2017	SMMP Stage 1	Advanced Concrete Engineering - WEC (ACE-WEC)	Quoceant Ltd., University of Dundee, Black and Veatch, Innosea, David Kerr	£245,231	
10 Jan 2017	SMMP Stage 1	Polyshell	Technology from Ideas ltd., DuPont, Cruz Atcheson Consulting Engineers, Radius Systems	£244,500	
10 Jan 2017	SMMP Stage 1	Netbuoy	Tension Technology International Ltd., Black and Veatch Ltd., Optimus (Abderdeen) Ltd., Quoceant Ltd.	£245,300	Progressed to Stage 2
10 Jan 2017	SMMP Stage 1	ELASTO (A feasibility Study on Elastomeric-based WECs.	University of Edinburgh, University of Plymouth, Griffon Hoverwork	£244,714	
10 Jan 2017	SMMP Stage 1	Rotational Moulding of Polymers, Composites and Hybrid WEC Structures	University of Edinburgh, Queens University Belfast, Pelagic Innovation, CETO UK, Eire Composites, Kingspan Environmental	£250,000	
27 Apr 2017	NWEC Stage 2	ACER2	4c Engineering	£659,515.80	
27 Apr 2017	NWEC Stage 2	Improved Archimedes Waveswing™	AWS Ocean Energy Ltd	£721,265	Progressed to Stage 3
27 Apr 2017	NWEC Stage 2	Anaconda Novel Wave Energy Converter Stage 2	Checkmate Seaenergy Ltd	£727,135	
27 Apr 2017	NWEC Stage 2	Mocean WEC: Next-Level Hydrodynamics and Engineering	Mocean Energy Ltd	£729,948	Progressed to Stage 3
13 Sep 2017	CS Stage 1	SURF-MATIC	Wave Venture, Mocean Energy Ltd., Altran Ltd., CorPower Ocean AB	£48,860	
13 Sep 2017	CS Stage 1	Predictability Bounded Control of the Mocean WEC	Mocean Energy Ltd., University of Bath	£34,434	
13 Sep 2017	CS Stage 1	WEETICS	University of Edinburgh, Oceantec Energias Marinas SL, Tecnalia Research and Innovation	£45,000	
13 Sep 2017	CS Stage 1	Adaptive Control of the WaveSub WEC using a Romax electromechanical PTO	Marine Power Systems Ltd., University of Bath, Romax Technology Ltd.	£41,850	
13 Sep 2017	CS Stage 1	DataWave	Mocean Energy Ltd., Wave Venture, CorPower Ocean AB, Polygen Ltd., MarynSol Ltd	£46,200	
13 Sep 2017	CS Stage 1	WEQUAD FRAME Project	INNOSEA Ltd., EPF Elettrotecnica Srl	£41690	
13 Sep 2017	CS Stage 1	Cost of Energy Optimised by Reinforcement Learning (CEORL)	Maxsim Ltd., Caelulum Ltd., Aquaharmonics Inc, Wave Conundrums Consulting, David Forehand, David Pizer, Mocean Energy Ltd, CorPower Ocean AB	£46,926	Progressed to Stage 2
13 Sep 2017	CS Stage 1	Control of WECs based on dielectric elastomer generators	University of Edinburgh, Cheros Srl, University of Bologna, University of Trento	£47,000	
13 Sep 2017	CS Stage 1	Non-linear Optimal Control: Concepts, Practicalities and Benefits	Mocean Energy Ltd., Pelagic Innovation Ltd., Industrial Systems and Control Ltd.	£47,000	
13 Sep 2017	CS Stage 1	Adaptive hierarchical model predictive control of wave energy converters	Mocean Energy Ltd, Queen Mary University of London	£28,209	
13 Sep 2017	CS Stage 1	Forewave	Innosea Ltd., Politecnico di Torino, Wave for Energy Srl, Industrial Systems and control Ltd.	£37,600	
13 Sep 2017	CS Stage 1	IMPACT Integrated Marine Point Absorber Control Tool	SgurrControl Ltd., Cruz Atcheson Consulting Engineers	£47,000	Progressed to Stage 2
13 Sep 2017	CS Stage 1	Wave Energy Advanced Control System (WEACS)	CPower Alba Ltd., SgurrControl Ltd., Wave Venture.	£46,900	
28 Feb 2018	PTO Stage 3	Power Electronic Controlled Magnet Gear (PECMAG)	Ecosse Subsea Systems, Bathwick Electrical Design Ltd, Supply Design Ltd, and Pure Marine Gen Ltd.	£2.5m	
27 Mar 2018	CS Stage 2	Integrated Marine Point Absorber Control Tool (IMPACT)	SgurrControl, Cruz Atcheson.	£187,409	
27 Mar 2018	CS Stage 2	Cost of Energy Optimised by Reinforcement Learning (CEORL)	MaxSim Ltd, Caelulum Ltd, Aquaharmonics Inc., Wave Conundrums Consulting, University of Edinburgh, Marine Systems Modelling, REOptimize Systems.	£187,500	Progressed to Stage 3
27 Mar 2018	CS Stage 2	Adaptive Hierarchical Model Predictive Control (AHMPC) for WEC control	Queen Mary University of London, University of Exeter, Mocean Energy Ltd.	£151,304	Progressed to Stage 3
19 Jul 2018	SMMP Stage 2	WES CREATE (Concrete as a Technology Enabler) – Stage 2	Ove Arup, University of Dundee, Cruz Atcheson Consulting Engineers, Carnegie Clean Energy Limited, MPA British Precast, Mocean Energy Ltd	£375,564	Progressed to Stage 3
19 Jul 2018	SMMP Stage 2	HydroComp	CorPower Ocean AB, Balmoral Comtec Limited, Wave Venture Ltd	£399,900	
19 Jul 2018	SMMP Stage 2	Netbuoy II	Tension Technology International Limited, University of Strathclyde, TTI Testing Limited, Optimus (Aberdeen) Limited, Black & Veatch Limited, Quoceant Limited.	£396,664	Progressed to Stage 3
8 Jan 2019	NWEC Stage 3	Mocean WEC: Blue Horizon	Mocean Energy, Blackfish Engineering Design Limited, Industrial Systems and Controls Ltd, Supply Design Ltd, AJS Design Engineering Ltd, Leask Marine Ltd, Aquatera Ltd, The European Marine Energy Centre Ltd, Orcades Marine Management Consultants Ltd, Oceaneering, MAESTRO Marine LLC, Budapest University of Technology and Economics.	£3,324,720	
8 Jan 2019	NWEC Stage 3	At sea demonstration of the Archimedes Waveswing	AWS Ocean Energy, Quoceant Ltd, Pelagic Innovation Ltd, Orcades Marine Management Consultants Ltd, 4c Engineering, Malin Group Ltd.	£3,321,226	
16 May 2019	CS Stage 3	Cost of Energy Optimised by Reinforced Learning (CEORL)	MaxSim Ltd, REOptimize Systems, AquaHarmonics Inc, Wave Conundrums Consulting, University of Edinburgh, Quoceant Ltd, Caelulum Ltd, Marine Systems Modelling	£475,000	
16 May 2019	CS Stage 3	Adaptive hierarchical model predictive control of wave energy converters	Queen Mary University of London, Mocean Energy Ltd., University of Exeter	£461,345	
5 Dec 2019	QCS Stage 1	Pull and Lock Marine (PALM) Connection System	Apollo	£47,850	Progressed to Stage 2
5 Dec 2019	QCS Stage 1	C-DART Quick Connection System	Blackfish Engineering Ltd, Skua Marine Ltd.	£69,050	Progressed to Stage 2
5 Dec 2019	QCS Stage 1	SEMC (Subsea Electrical & Mooring Connector)	Ditrel Industrial S.L., Fundación TECNALIA Research & Innovation, Highland Design Engineering Ltd (trading as 4c Engineering).	£69,800	
5 Dec 2019	QCS Stage 1	MECmate	Nova Innovation Ltd, Wave Venture Ltd.	£68,900	Progressed to Stage 2
5 Dec 2019	QCS Stage 1	Q-Connect	Quoceant Ltd, EMEC, Inyanga Maritime Ltd.	£69,344	Progressed to Stage 2
5 Dec 2019	QCS Stage 1	Rocksteady WEC Mooring and Electrical Connection	Subsea Riser Products Ltd, 2H Offshore Engineering Ltd, CETO Wave Energy UK Ltd, CorPower Ocean Ltd, InterMoor Ltd, TE Connectivity Ltd.	£69,602	
5 Dec 2019	QCS Stage 1	THOR-QCS (Tension Hookup Operation and Retrieval - QCS)	TTI Marine Renewables Ltd, Tension Technology International Ltd.	£66,675	
27 Mar 2020	SMMP Stage 3	CREATE (Stage 3) - Concrete as a Technology Enabler	Ove Arup & Partners Ltd, K2Management Lda, British Precast Concrete Federation Ltd, Carnegie Clean Energy, AWS Ocean Energy Ltd, BAM Nuttall Ltd.	£0.5m	
27 Mar 2020	SMMP Stage 3	Netbuoy III	Tension Technology International Ltd, Griffon Hoverwork Ltd, Kelvin Hydrodynamics Laboratory - University of Strathclyde, International Centre for Island Technology (Heriot Watt University - ICIT, Orkney Campus), PSG Marine & Logistics Ltd.	£0.5m	
14 Jul 2020	QCS Stage 2	Pull and Lock Marine (PALM)	Apollo		Progressed to Stage 3
14 Jul 2020	QCS Stage 2	C-DART	Blackfish Engineering Design		Progressed to Stage 3
14 Jul 2020	QCS Stage 2	MECmate	Nova Innovation		
14 Jul 2020	QCS Stage 2	Q-Connect	Quoceant		Progressed to Stage 3
5 Jul 2021	QCS Stage 3	Pull and Lock Marine (PALM)	Apollo Offshore Engineering		
5 Jul 2021	QCS Stage 3	C-DART	Blackfish Engineering Design		
5 Jul 2021	QCS Stage 3	Q-Connect	Quoceant		
20 Oct 2023	DG Stage 1		4c Engineering	£250k between five projects	Progressed to Stage 2
20 Oct 2023	DG Stage 1		AWS Ocean Energy	£250k between five projects	
20 Oct 2023	DG Stage 1		Southampton and UTC	£250k between five projects	
20 Oct 2023	DG Stage 1		WaveX	£250k between five projects	
20 Oct 2023	DG Stage 1		TTI Renewables	£250k between five projects	Progressed to Stage 2
1 Aug 2024	DG Stage 1		4c Engineering	£400k between two projects	
1 Aug 2024	DG Stage 1		TTI Renewables	£400k between two projects	
