= Owel =

Owel may refer to:

- OWEL, a band
- OWEL, a former wave power project
- Lough Owel, a lake in Ireland
- Umhaill, a Gaelic territory sometimes anglicized as "Owel"

== See also ==
- Owl
- Owell Open
