= CETO =

Submerged wave power technology

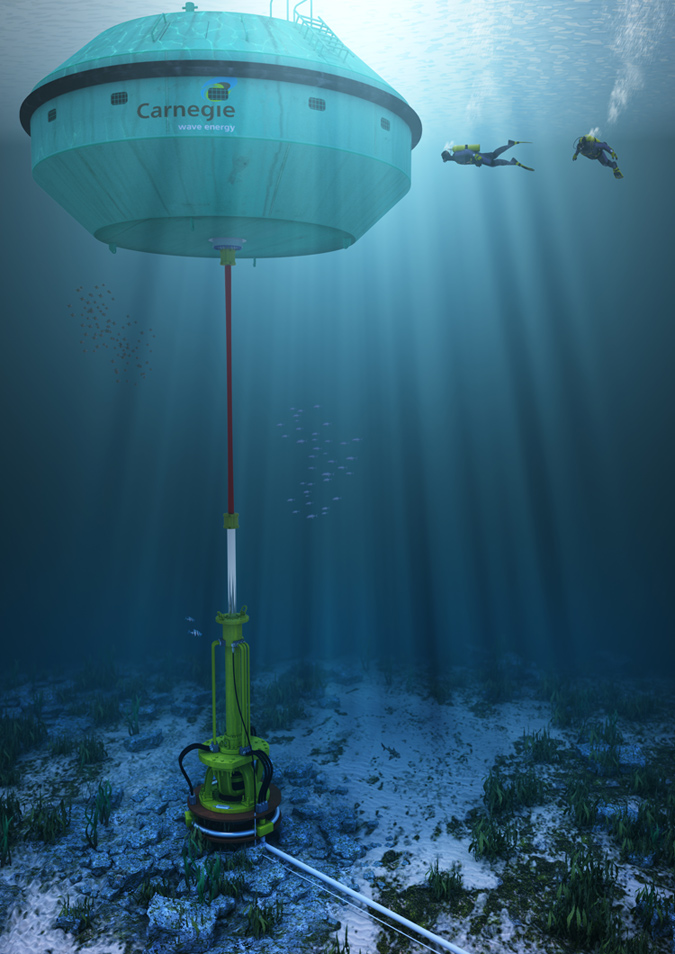
Artistic rendering of CETO 5 unit

CETO is a wave-energy technology currently being developed by Australian company Carnegie Clean Energy and its international subsidiaries. CETO is a fully submerged device that converts kinetic energy from ocean swell into electrical power, and in some cases directly desalinates freshwater through reverse osmosis. The name is inspired by the Greek ocean goddess, Ceto.

The technology was developed and tested onshore and offshore in Fremantle, Western Australia. In early 2015 a CETO 5 production installation was commissioned and connected to the grid. As of January 2016 all the electricity generated is being purchased to contribute towards the power requirements of HMAS Stirling naval base at Garden Island, Western Australia. Some of the energy will also be used directly to desalinate water.

Further development of the CETO technology within the EuropeWave project commenced in December 2021, and as of March 2025 is still ongoing.

CETO is designed to be a simple and robust wave technology. As of January 2016 CETO is claimed to be the only ocean-tested wave-energy technology globally that can be both fully submerged and generating power/desalinated water at the same time. The CETO technology has been independently verified by Energies Nouvelles (EDF EN) and the French naval contractor DCNS.

== Technology ==
The CETO technology consists of a fully submerged buoy anchored to the seabed. Ocean swell causes the buoy to move, and this motion relative to the seabed is harnessed directly to produce electricity in CETO 6, or using pumps to provide pressurised water in the case of CETO 5 and earlier versions.

=== CETO 5 ===
Submerged buoys are moved by the ocean swell and driving pumps that pressurise seawater delivered ashore by a subsea pipeline. Once onshore, the high-pressure seawater is used to drive hydro-electric turbines, generating electricity. The high-pressure seawater can also be used to supply a reverse osmosis desalination plant, producing freshwater. Some historic conventional seawater desalination plants are large emitters of greenhouse gases; this is due to the amount of energy required to drive the grid-connected pumps that deliver the high-pressure seawater to reverse osmosis membranes for the removal of the salt.

=== CETO 6 ===
As of January 2016, CETO 6 is in development, and differs from CETO 5 in having a larger buoy, with the electrical generation onboard and the power being transferred to shore by an electrical cable. The buoy is designed for deeper water and further offshore than CETO 5.

== History ==
Carneige Wave Power was founded by Alan Burns, an entrepreneur and inventor from Western Australia. Michael Ottaviano took over as chief executive in 2003.

CETO was developed by Seapower Pacific PTY Ltd (SPPL) with involvement of Renewable Energy Holdings PLC (REH) in Western Australia. The initial versions, CETO I and II, were seabed mounted, and pumped water to shore to be used in an off-the-shelf reverse osmosis desalination system or a Pelton turbine. The first version used a rubber diaphragm pump mounted within the device; however, to reduce the size of the seabed device, CETO II used a spherical buoy attached to the pump and moving with the subsurface wave orbital motion. By the end of 2006, CETO I had been tested in Fremantle, there were plans to test CETO II at the same site, and a commercial-scale CETO III was envisaged.

In April and May 2011, Carnegie Wave Power tested a single commercial-scale CETO 3 in Stage 1 of the Perth Wave Energy Project (PWEP), although not grid connected. The CETO 3 was rated at 80 kW.

In 2011, CETO Wave Power Ireland investigated possible projects in County Clare, on the west cost of Ireland.

In 2012, a CETO 4 device was delivered to Réunion Island, in a joint venture with EDF EN. However, the device was damaged and swept away during a cyclone in January 2014.

In November 2014 and January 2015, two CETO 5 devices were then installed in the PWEP. These began supplying electricity to the local grid in February 2015.

Development of the CETO 6 began in 2015, with concept design completed early in 2016. The new design was stated to be rated at around 1 MW, or 4× the power of CETO 5, with the power generation inside the buoyant actuator improving efficiency.

In October 2017, Carnegie Clean Energy was awarded $15.75 million in grant funding by the State Government to develop a wave farm in Albany, Western Australia. The 1 MW project was to be located at Sandpatch. Alongside this, the University of Western Australia was awarded $3.75 million, to set up the Wave Energy Research Centre, also in Albany, with the aim of making Albany into a hub for marine renewable energy development. However, in March 2019, the contract to build the wave farm was terminated by the state government.

Carnegie Clean Energy then went into voluntary administration in March 2019. The company was suspended from the Australian Securities Exchange weeks earlier, having failed to meet a reporting deadline for half-yearly results. By that point it had raised nearly $200m from government grants combined with debt and equity.

== Projects ==
=== Perth Wave Energy Project ===
The Perth Wave Energy Project (PWEP), located off the coast of Garden Island, near Perth, Western Australia, aimed to provide power and water to the nearby HMAS Stirling naval base. The PWEP was supported by the Australian Renewable Energy Agency (ARENA) between 30 April 2012 until 31 December 2017 and had a project cost of almost $40m AUD with $13m from ARENA.

==== Stage 1 ====
Stage 1 involved the manufacture, deployment and testing of a single commercial-scale CETO 3 unit off Garden Island. The devices was located in the Sepia Depression, between Garden Island and Five Fathom Bank, in approximately 25 m (82 ft) water depth. Construction began in 2010 with the device operational by April 2011. For this stage, the CETO unit was not connected to shore but was stand-alone and autonomous, providing telemetric data back to shore for confirmation and independent verification of the unit's performance. By May 2011, Carnegie announced they had successfully completed Stage 1, and had collected "an enormous amount of data" on the CETO 3 unit.

On completion of Stage 1 of the Perth Wave Energy Project, Carnegie enlisted Frazer-Nash Consultancy Ltd to verify the CETO 3 unit's measured and modelled capacity. During the CETO 3 in-ocean trial, Frazer–Nash verified the peak measured capacity to be 78 kW and delivered a sustained pressure of 77 bar (1,120 psi), above what is required for seawater reverse osmosis desalination.

==== Stage 2 ====
Stage 2 involved the design, construction, deployment and operational performance evaluation of a grid-connected commercial-scale wave-energy demonstration project, also at Garden Island. The facility consisted of multiple submerged CETO units in an array, subsea pipeline(s) to shore, hydraulic conditioning equipment, and an onshore power generation facility. In 2014, it was anticipated between four and eight CETO units would be deployed.

In September 2012, the next-generation CETO 5 was unveiled, with a larger buoy diameter of 11 metres (36 ft) and rated power of 240 kW, compared to the 7 m (23 ft) and around 80 kW of CETO 3.

In December 2013, Fugro Seacore commenced work on the subsea foundations and pipelines to shore.

In November 2014, the first CETO 5 buoy was installed off Garden Island, with the second installed in January 2015.

The onshore power station was commissioned in February 2015, making the PWEP the "first array of wave power generators to be connected to an electricity grid in Australia and worldwide", according to ARENA CEO Ivor Frischknecht.

All the electricity was bought to power HMAS Stirling naval base. Two fully submerged buoys, which are anchored to the seabed, transmit the energy from the ocean swell through hydraulic pressure onshore to drive a generator for electricity, and also to produce fresh water. In 2015, a third buoy was planned for installation.

In January 2016, the PWEP completed its first 12 months of operation, completing all of the funding milestones for the project.

=== La Réunion Wave Energy Project ===
The Réunion Island project was a joint venture between Carnegie and EDF Energies Nouvelles (EDF EN). Carnegie entered into a joint venture with EDF EN signing a technology licence agreement in 2009, and memoranda of understanding with EDF EN and DCNS in 2010.

The project was initially expected to consist of the deployment of a single, autonomous commercial scale unit (stage 1), followed by a 2MW plant (stage 2) and a further expansion of the project to a nominal 15MW installed capacity (stage 3). As of April 2011 stage 1 had been awarded $5M of French government funding. The site for the wave energy device was about 600 metres (2,000 ft) offshore, between the Aéroport de Pierrefonds and Pointe du Diable.

The CETO 4 unit was ready to be deployed in April 2012, however this was delayed awaiting a suitable weather window.

A cable between a buoy and the seabed anchored hydraulic pump snapped in a CETO 4 prototype installation in January 2014. The buoy was swept away during Cyclone Bejisa, which also led to a fatality and widespread damage on Réunion Island. The design was an earlier iteration than the Perth CETO 5 installation and lacked the quick-release mechanism that was included in CETO 5.

=== Ireland Wave Energy Project ===
Carnegie has signed a formal funding and collaboration agreement with the Irish Government's Sustainable Energy Association (SEAI) for a €150,000 project to evaluate potential CETO wave sites in Ireland and develop a site-specific conceptual design. The project is 50% funded by the SEAI and 50% by Carnegie and forms the first phase of detailed design for a potential 5 MW commercial demonstration project in Irish waters. The project was underway in 2011 and is being managed through Carnegie's Irish subsidiary, CETO Wave Energy Ireland Limited.

Completed in 2011, the project identified two potential near-shore sites in County Clare. CWE Ireland applied for a Foreshore Licence to develop a project between Freagh Point and Spanish Point.

=== EuropeWave ACHIEVE project ===
In December 2021, CETO Wave Energy Ireland Ltd. was announced as one of the companies selected to develop their technology in the EuropeWave programme with the ACHIEVE project. This project was successful in completing Stages 1 and 2, and in September 2023, was selected as one of three technologies to progress to Stage 3.

Stage 3 of EuropeWave will result in a CETO device being tested for a year at the Biscay Marine Energy Platform (BiMEP) in the Basque Country. Carnegie Clean Energy secured a berth, originally reserved by Wave Energy Scotland, in April 2024. Also in April 2024, they passed the EuropeWave authorisation to proceed milestone, enabling them to award the first contracts for fabrication of the device. The Stage 3 contract was worth €3.75m.

In September 2023, as part of the Renamrinas Demos Program the Spanish government awarded €1.2m funding to Carnegie's Spanish subsidiary, Carnegie Technologies Spain. This will allow them to enhance and extend the deployment of the device.

In March 2025, it was announced Carnegie had received a milestone payment of over €300k as part of the ACHIVE project, with the remainder to be paid upon completing further activities within the project. The company is working towards building a CETO device rated at about 400 kW, to be tested at BiMEP.

== Relationships ==
- Western Australian Government – $12.5M grant for the Perth Wave Energy Project at Garden Island.
- Australian Department of Defence & Defence Support Group – MoU for Collaboration on a CETO power and water project and offtake.
- EDF EN – Northern Hemisphere CETO Power licensee and JV development partner.
- French Government – $5M grant for Carnegie/EDF EN Stage 1 Réunion Island power project.
- DCNS – Northern Hemisphere EPCM partner.
- Sustainable Energy Authority of Ireland – Collaboration agreement & concept funding for a 5 MW Irish CETO power project.
- British Columbia Government – Grant of $2M for a Canadian CETO project.
- Australian National Centre of Excellence in Desalination – Desalination research project with funding granted.

== Other wave energy and CETO characteristics ==
- Wave energy is a renewable, high-availability source of power.
- About 60% of the human population lives within 60 kilometres of a coastline, minimising transmission issues.
- Since water is about 800 times denser than air, the energy density of waves exceeds that of wind and solar, increasing the amount of energy available for harvesting.
- Waves are predictable in advance, making it easier to predict mismatches between supply and demand.
- CETO does not stand for Cylindrical Energy Transfer Oscillating unit – a popular misconception. The name refers to Ceto, a Greek sea goddess.
- CETO sits underwater, moored to the sea floor, with minimal visual impact above the water. In practice, buoys have been fitted with warning lights on a mast above water.
- CETO units operate in deep water, away from breaking waves, meaning there is minimal impact on popular surfing sites.
- CETO units are designed to operate in harmony with the waves. This means, that apart from anchor points, there is no need for massive steel and concrete support structures to be built.
- CETO units act like artificial reefs because of the way they attract marine life.

== See also ==
- Water desalination
- Wave farm
- Baseload
- World energy resources and consumption
