= Wave Energy Scotland =

Wave Energy Scotland (WES) is a technology development body set up in 2015 by the Scottish Government to facilitate the development of wave energy in Scotland. WES is a subsidiary of Highlands and Islands Enterprise (HIE), based in Inverness.

WES has managed numerous projects resulting from pre-commercial procurement funding calls (Note: "Pre-commercial procurement" concerns the commissioning of research and development delivery in advance of production becoming commercially feasible.) in six main topic areas: power take-off, novel wave energy converters, structural materials and manufacturing processes, control systems, quick connection systems, and next generation wave energy. Each of these uses a stage-gate process, with fewer successful projects passing to later stages. WES has also commissioned eight landscaping studies in two phases.

In 2020, together with the Basque Energy Agency (Ente Vasco de la Energía or EVE), WES set up the EuropeWave programme to develop and test the most promising wave energy technologies, of which three concepts will be tested at sea. This is supported by European Horizon 2020 funding.

== Inception ==
The Scottish Government took positive action to support the ailing wave energy sector in Scotland, following the demise of one of the leading developers Pelamis Wave Power. The Energy Minister Fergus Ewing announced an initial budget for the body of £14.3 million over 13 months at the RenewableUK conference in February 2015.

=== Organisation objectives ===
The original objectives for WES were set out by the Scottish Government as:

- Seek to retain the intellectual property and know-how from device development in Scotland for future benefit;
- Enable Scotland’s indigenous technologies to reach commercial readiness in the most efficient and effective manner, and in a way that allows the public sector to exit in due course;
- Ensure that the learning gained from support for wave device development and deployment to date, in particular the learning from Scotland’s leading wave technologies, is retained and used to benefit the wave energy industry;
- Avoid duplication in funding, encourage collaboration between companies and research institutes and foster greater standardisation across the industry;
- Ensure value for money from public sector investment; and
- Promote greater confidence in the technical performance of wave energy systems in order to encourage the return of private sector investment.
- Promote innovation in wave energy technology and encourage collaboration between industry, academia, and government

== Stage gate selections ==
The WES development programme uses a series of stage-gates to evaluate technology progress.

Through collaboration with the International Energy Agency's Ocean Energy Systems programme, Wave Energy Scotland has helped to develop "An International Evaluation and Guidance Framework for Ocean Energy Technology", first published in 2021. This sets out a clear evaluation methodology for the technical development and cost-effectiveness of wave and tidal energy technologies. A second edition was published in October 2023, adding the important aspect of environmental acceptability which had been missing from the first draft.

The framework consists of six sequential stages of development, which is equivalent to those used in the IEC guidelines for testing early stage WECs, and can be linked to the widely used Technology Readiness Level (TRL) scale.

IEA-OES Evaluation Framework Stages
	Name	TRL
Stage 0	Concept creation	1
Stage 1	Concept development	2–3
Stage 2	Design optimisation	4
Stage 3	Scaled demonstration	5–6
Stage 4	Commercial-scale single device demonstration	7–8
Stage 5	Commercial-scale array demonstration	9

== Project calls ==
The WES development programme uses a staged approach with projects progressing from concept (stage 1), through design (stage 2), to demonstration (stage 3). As of April 2024, WES has held funding calls to start five development programmes, listed below. The successful projects in each stage are tabulated in List of projects funded by Wave Energy Scotland.

Call Title	Launch Date	Call Closed	Budget	Notice
Secondary energy conversion technologies (power take-off systems, PTO)	19 March 2015	22 May 2015	£7m	MAR203890
Novel wave energy converters (NWEC)	10 June 2015	13 August 2015	up to £2.4m	JUN211095
Structural materials and manufacturing processes (SMMP)	15 July 2016	8 September 2016	up to £3m	JUL250786
Control systems (CS)	5 April 2017	12 June 2017	£660k	APR279121
Quick Connection Systems (QCS)	24 July 2019	16 September 2019	£490k	JUL361298

In 2023, a sixth area of Next Generation Wave Energy was introduced, focusing on flexible generators.

=== Power Take-off (PTO) ===
In March 2015, WES announced the fist call of their development programme, for innovative power take-off systems. Depending on the status of the technology, projects of £100k to £4m were sought, with successful applicants eligible to claim 100% of the cost of development. A total of 42 applications were made for this £7m call, with contracts awarded to nine consortia.

- In July 2016, a total of 16 Power Take-Off projects were awarded, with over £7m total funding.
  - Nine projects in Stage 1, at around £90k each.
  - Five projects directly into Stage 2, at between £300k and £500k each.
  - One project starting in Stage 3, the CorPower Ocean HiDrive project with £1.9m in funding.
- In September 2016, four of the nine PTO Stage 1 projects progressed to Stage 2, each awarded funding of around £490k.
- In March 2017, three of the original Stage 2 projects progressed to Stage 3, with nearly £2.5m funding each.
- In February 2018, one of the original Stage 1 projects also progressed to Stage 3 and was awarded £2.5m.

=== Novel Wave Energy Converter Call (NWEC) ===
In June 2015, the second call was announced, this time for "truly novel" wave energy converters. Eight projects were funded for the first stage of the NWEC call, out of 37 applications.

- In November 2015, eight projects were each awarded between £250k-£300k for 12 month NWEC Stage 1 projects, a total of £2.25m in funding.
- Four of these projects progressed to Stage 2 in April 2017, awarded around £700k in further funding.
- In January 2019, Mocean Energy and AWS Ocean Energy were awarded £7.7m between them for Stage 3 projects. Both companies planned to build half-scale devices and test them at the European Marine Energy Centre in real-sea conditions.

=== Structural Materials and Manufacturing Processes Call ===
A third call for Structural Materials and Manufacturing Processes was launched in July 2016, looking for materials for the WEC structure or prime mover that would facilitate a step change reduction in LCOE.

- In January 2017, 10 awards of around £250k each were made, for 12 month Stage 1 projects.
- In July 2018, three of these projects progressed to Stage 2, with a further £1.4m in funding between them.
- In March 2020, two projects then progressed to Stage 3: one Project led by Arup investigating the use of concrete as a structural material, the second led by Tension Technology International will look into a flexible buoyant pod.

=== Control Systems ===
In April 2017, a call on feasibility studies for Control System was announced, particularly welcoming experience from other related sectors. This was for initial projects of up to £47k lasting three months.

- In September 2017, 13 projects were awarded at Stage 1, with a total budget of £660k.
- Three of these projects progressed to Stage 2 in March 2018.
- In May 2019, two then progressed to Stage 3, sharing a budget of almost £1m.

=== Quick Connection System ===
A call was launched in July 2019 for systems that facilitate rapid connection and disconnection of a WEC from the moorings/electrical system, which was expected to speed up installation and operations, both leading to reduced costs.

- Seven projects were awarded at Stage 1 in December 2019.
- Of these, four progressed to Stage 2 in July 2020.
- Three then progressed to Stage 3 in July 2021, with almost £1.8m in funding.

=== Next Generation Wave Energy ===
In July 2023, a call was launched for concept designs that would directly convert motion into electricity, harnessing novel flexible electrostatic polymers and elastomers. Five projects were awarded up to £50k for 12-14 week concept designs investigating dielectric elastomer generators, and dielectric fluid generators.

Two projects, led by 4c Engineering and TTI Marine Renewables, were awarded a further £400k funding in August 2024 for Stage 2. Over the following nine months, they are expected to form collaborations and progress their concepts for flexible wave energy devices.

== EuropeWave ==
In December 2020, together with the Basque Energy Agency (Ente Vasco de la Energía or EVE), WES set up the EuropeWave programme. This builds on the WES programme, using the same staged approach and pre-commercial procurement model. The programme has a budget of over €22.5m, comprising national, regional, and European Horizon 2020 funding. Trade association Ocean Energy Europe is also part of the consortium.

As with the WES Novel Wave Energy Converter call, the programme will consist of three stages (1–3), culminating in scaled demonstration in real sea conditions for a year, at either the European Marine Energy Centre, Orkney, Scotland, or the Biscay Marine Energy Platform (BiMEP) near Armintza, Basque Country.

Seven companies, listed in the table below, were selected in December 2021 to develop their device concepts, sharing a budget of €2.4m. After completing Stage 1, the five most promising technologies progressed to Stage 2 to perform more extensive modelling and testing to optimise their design.

In September 2023, it was announced that CETO Wave Energy Ireland ACHIEVE, IDOM Consulting MARMOK-Atlantic, and Mocean Energy Blue Horizon 250 had progressed to the final stage of the EuropeWave programme with a shared budget of €13.4m. In April 2024, CETO secured a berth to test at BiMEP and also passed the authorisation to proceed milestone, enabling them to award the first contracts for fabrication of the device. Mocean plan to test their 250 kW device at the EMEC Billia Croo site, aiming to launch in 2025.

Companies in the EuropeWave programme
Company	Project	Status
AMOG Consulting	Sea-Saw WEC	Progressed to stage 2
Arrecife Energy Systems	Trimaran	Progressed to stage 2
Bombora Wave Power Europe	emWave	Completed stage 1
CETO Wave Energy Ireland	ACHIEVE	Progressed to stages 2 and 3
IDOM Consulting	MARMOK Atlantic	Progressed to stages 2 and 3
Mocean Energy	Blue Horizon 250	Progressed to stages 2 and 3
Waveram	The Waveram	Completed stage 1

== Intellectual property ==
WES acquired intellectual property developed by the now defunct Scottish wave energy companies Pelamis Wave Power and Aquamarine Power. The former as part of the inception of Wave Energy Scotland, hiring 12 former Pelamis employees including CEO Richard Yemm. The latter was completed in September 2016.

== Knowledge Library ==
WES maintain an online Knowledge Library as part of their website, to provide access to information and documents from their extensive technology development programmes. It also contains reports from the knowledge capture projects from Pelamis Wave Power, Aquamarine Power, and AWS Ocean Energy.

== Annual conference ==
With the exception of 2020 and 2021, WES has held an annual conference since 2016 to showcase progress in the sector.

The first Wave Energy Scotland annual conference was held on 2 December 2016 at Pollock Halls in Edinburgh. This provided an update of ongoing and future calls, plus quick-fire updates from participants ongoing PTO and NWEC calls.

A second annual conference was held on 28 November 2017.

The third annual conference was held on 6 December 2018 at the Edinburgh International Conference Centre.

== See also ==
- Wave power
- Renewable energy in the United Kingdom
- List of wave power projects
- Marine energy
- Renewable energy in Scotland
