= AW-Energy WaveRoller =

Wave energy converter

WaveRoller is a wave energy converter (WEC) developed by Finish company AW-Energy Oy since 2002, although the initial concept was developed between 1993 and 1999.

The device is a submerged hinged flap, or oscillating wave surge converter (OWSC) type. This uses the inshore then offshore surging motion of waves near the coast to rotate the hinged flap, or paddle, to generate electricity or to pump water onshore for desalination.

Two devices have been tested off Peniche, Portugal, in 2012 and between 2019 and 2021. In September 2024, the ONDEP project was announced which will deploy and operate an array of four WaveRoller devices in the same location.

== Device concept ==
The WaveRoller device is fully submerged on the seabed fairly near the shore, located approximately 300 metres (1,000 ft) to 2 kilometres (1.2 mi) offshore, in water depths of 8 to 20 metres (26 to 66 ft).

The device consists of a movable panel, which rotates backwards and forwards in pitch following the surging motion of nearshore waves. This forces hydraulic pistons, pumping fluid within a closed loop through power smoothing attenuators, before driving a hydraulic motor. This is connected to an electrical generator to produce electricity.

== History ==
While diving off the coast of Finland in 1993, Rauno Koivusaari, the inventor of WaveRoller, observed the surging motion of ocean waves moving a large hatch on a shipwreck, and realised this power could be harnessed. An initial proof of concept was tested in 1999.

AW Energy was founded in Finland in 2002, and is based in Vantaa just north of Helsinki.

Early component tests for the WaveRoller were conducted at the European Marine Energy Centre Billia Croo test site in 2005.

=== Half-scale prototype testing, Peniche, Portugal ===
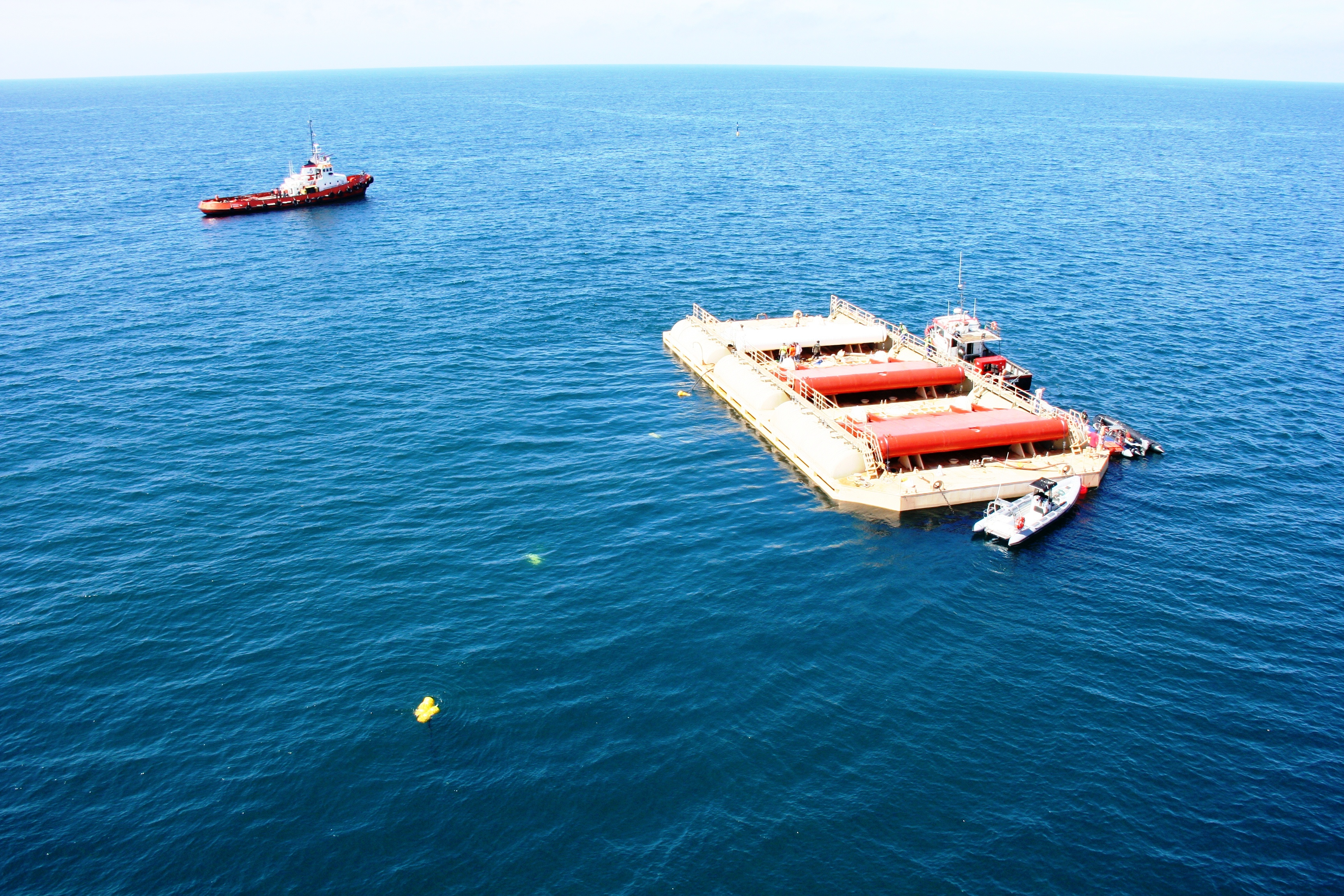
WaveRoller wave energy farm installation in Peniche, Portugal 2012

In 2009, a consortium led by AW-Energy was awarded €3m by the European Commission under FP7 to build and demonstrate a grid connected wave energy device. The consortium also included leading engineering firms ABB and Bosch Rexroth. The three-year project was called SURGE – Simple Underwater Renewable Generation of Electricity, and aimed to deploy and demonstrate the WaveRoller device off the coast of Peniche, Portugal about 100 kilometres (62 mi) north of Lisbon from summer 2011. Peniche is known for its large waves, and is called «Capital da Ondas» or "Capital of the Waves".

Following delays, the device was eventually deployed in 2012, with 3× 100 kW flaps installed. It was later brought back to the harbour, and tested in configurations with either one, two, or three operational panels. It was mounted on a steel frame which could be towed to site, and then submerged onto the seabed.

=== MegaRoller project ===
Between 2018 and 2021, a 1 MW scale power-take-off (PTO) was developed in the European Horizon2020 funded MegaRoller project. A life-cycle assessment of the technology suggested the lifetime carbon emissions of the device would be 33.8 gCO_{2}eq/kWh. This had a nominal power of 1 MW, an average power of 320 kW, and an operational lifetime of 20 years.

=== Commercial-scale prototype ===
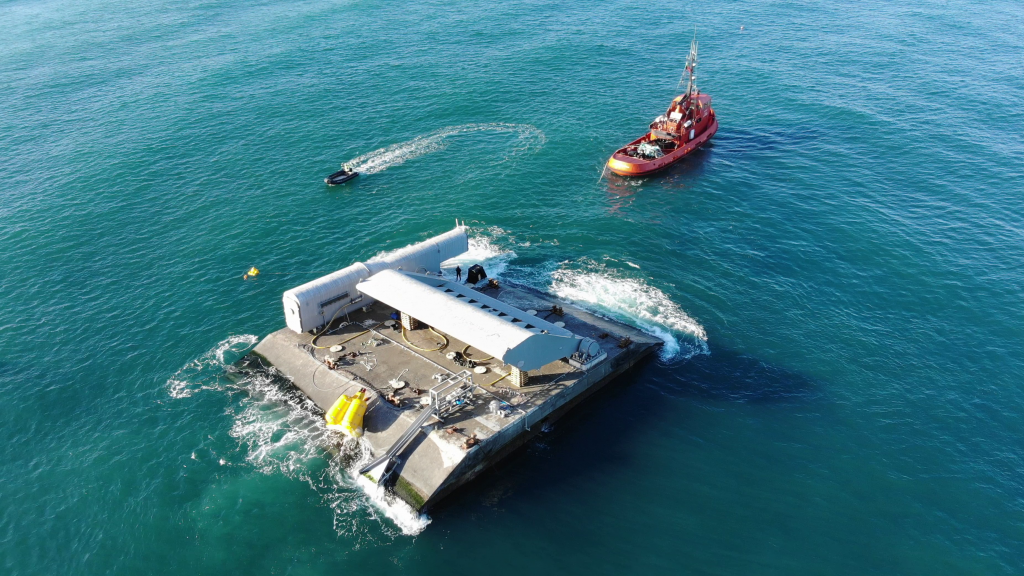
Later WaveRoller installation in Peniche, Portugal in 2019

In 2019, the first "commercial-scale" device was assembled in Peniche, rated at 350 kW. The device was certified by DNV GL and Lloyd's Register. The device was deployed in October 2019, 820 metres (2,700 ft) offshore.

A new onshore substation for the WaveRoller device was also constructed in 2019, as part of the Surge2 project.

After almost two years of continuous operation, the prototype device was retrieved in August 2021 for inspection including assessment of the structural integrity.

=== ONDEP project ===
In September 2024, the 5½ year long, Horizon Europe funded, ONDEP (Ondas de Peniche) project was announced. The consortium of 14 partners, led by Queen's University Belfast plan to deploy and operate an array of four WaveRoller devices off the coast of Peniche. This will be one of the first pilot wave farms in Europe.

== Future plans ==
AW-Energy announced in 2023 they had signed a memorandum of understanding with Kaoko Green Energy Solutions of Namibia, to explore the potential to deploy devices off the coast of Swakopmund, to provide power including for green hydrogen and desalination. The environmental impact assessment for the project was approved by the Namibian Ministry of Environment, Forestry, and Tourism in October 2024.
