= AWS Ocean Energy =

Scottish wave energy device developer

- Founded: May 2004; 22 years ago in Inverness, Scotland, UK
- Founder: Simon Grey
- Headquarters: Inverness, Scotland, UK
- Products: Wave energy converters
- Website: awsocean.com

AWS Ocean Energy Ltd (or just AWS) is a Scottish wave energy device developer, based in Dochfour near Inverness, Highland. The company has developed and tested several concepts, primarily the Archimedes Waveswing (AWS) after which the company is named.

Between 2015 and 2022, AWS received three rounds of funding through the Wave Energy Scotland Novel Wave Energy Convertor programme to develop a series of small-scale prototypes, the largest scale device was tested at EMEC in 2022, demonstrating a power output of 16 kW.

An American subsidiary, Waveswing America, came third in the 2016 Wave Energy Prize, run by the United States Department of Energy.

== History ==
The company was founded in May 2004, acquiring the intellectual property of the Archimedes Wave Swing technology that had been developed by Teamwork Technology BV in the Netherlands, and tested at Aguçadoura, Portugal in 2004. These tests demonstrated the direct-drive permanent-magnet linear generator technology.

AWS developed a Mark II Waveswing over the following years, including 1:50 scale testing. However, the projected costs were 500–700 £/MWh for the first farms and seen as unlikely to reach commercial viability, therefore development was halted in 2008. AWS instead focused development on a surface floating variant of the Waveswing called the ASW-III.

In September 2014, the original Waveswing concept was revisited, with further innovations identified that could reduce costs and allow down-scaling of the device. AWS then re-focused on the development of the Archimedes Waveswing technology.

== AWS-III ==
The AWS-III concept was a multi-cell ring-shaped device. This was similar to the CLAM design invented in 1983 by Norman Bellamy at Lanchester Polytechnic, of which AWS acquired the IP. In 2010, a 1:9 scale prototype of the AWS-III was tested in Loch Ness, echoing the earlier testing of a circular SEA-Clam in Loch Ness in the 1980s. The full-scale AWS-III device was projected to be 60 m diameter, with a rated power of 2.5 MW per unit.

Continued development of the AWS-III led to alternative configurations, including a twin-hull Proa design, with the wave absorbers on one side.

In 2011, Alstom acquired a 40% stake in AWS, complementing their investment in tidal and offshore wind. In January 2012, SSE Renewables and Alstom set up a joint-venture to develop the Costa Head wave farm off Orkney, which was proposed to use up to 80 of the AWS-III devices, generating 200 MW. However, due to market uncertainties including utility companies withdrawing from wave energy and uncertainty over reform of the electricity market, Alstom stopped investing in AWS in March 2013.

In 2014, AWS tested a half-scale prototype cell of the AWS-III at Lyness in Orkney. The device used diaphragms manufacture from 'bullet proof vest material' to capture power from the waves and power pressurised air turbines to generate electricity.

== Further development of Archimedes Waveswing in WES NWEC programme ==
Between 2015 and 2022, the AWS concept was further developed in the Wave Energy Scotland (WES) Novel Wave Energy Convertor (NWEC) programme, which used pre-commercial procurement to fund up to 100% of the technology development costs. (Note: "Pre-commercial procurement" concerns the commissioning of research and development delivery in advance of production becoming commercially feasible.)

In November 2015, WES announced that AWS was one of eight companies successful in being awarded £284k funding for Stage 1 concept design of an Advanced Archimedes Waveswing through the NWEC programme. They successfully completed this, and in April 2017 were awarded a further £721k for Stage 2 design optimisation.

In January 2019, AWS along with Mocean Energy were selected to progress to Stage 3, to develop and test half-scale devices at the European Marine Energy Centre in Orkney, sharing £7.7m in funding. The device was tested at the Scapa Flow non-grid-connected test site from April 2022. The device was 4 m in diameter, 7 m high, and weighed around 50 t. It is moored via a single tether to a gravity base anchor.

== Wave Energy Prize ==
The United States Department of Energy (DOE) announced in 2015 a competition to improve the efficiency of wave energy converter (WEC) devices. Waveswing America was one of 92 entrants, and in March 2016 qualified as one of nine finalists to receive up to $125,000 seed funding to develop and test a 1:20 scale model. These models were tested at the Naval Surface Warfare Center’s Maneuvering and Seakeeping (MASK) wave basin at Carderock, Maryland. In November 2016, after an 18-month competition, the results were announced. Waveswing America came in third place and was awarded a $250,000 cash prize.

== Waveswing technology ==
The Archimedes Waveswing is a submerged device, consisting of a two-part gas-filled "piston" which moves as the waves pass over it. It incorporates a direct-drive linear generator to produce electricity. The initial Wave Swing tested in 2004 was mounted on a submersible pontoon with an external frame. Both of these have been removed to simplify the device, and it is now tethered to the sea floor via a suitable anchor with pressure compensation to account for changes in tidal height.

The device consists of a cap like top section, the "floater", above a "silo", with a rolling seal between. When the crest of a wave passes over the device, the increased pressure pushes floater down, compressing the air inside the silo like a spring. The linear generator is mounted in the middle of the cylinder, producing electricity on both the downward and upward stroke.

== Combined wind-wave platforms ==
Following a report by Offshore Wind Consultants, Wave Energy Scotland explored the potential for multi-use platforms combining wave energy and floating offshore wind. They conducted tests at FloWave of a triangular semi-submerged floating platform, incorporating multiple wave energy devices based on the Archimedes Waveswing.
