= FloWave Ocean Energy Research Facility =

Scottish ocean energy research facility

Coordinates: 55.9220°N 3.1786°W

The FloWave Ocean Energy Research Facility, or FloWave Test Tank is a basin designed to test physical scale models of marine renewable energy devices, in a combined wave and current environment. The facility is located at The University of Edinburgh, King's Buildings campus, on Max Born Crescent. It was opened in June 2014.

The facility comprises a 25-metre (82 ft) diameter circular tank, with 168 active-absorbing wave makers around the circumference, and 28 pumps arranged beneath the raisable floor. These allow the creation of multi-directional random waves with current in any direction across the 15-metre (49 ft) diameter, 2-metre (6.6 ft) deep test area. The facility is optimised for approximately 1/10th to 1/40th scale model tests, with scale waves approximately 14-metre (46 ft) high and with a current of 7 knots. It is possible to recreate conditions in the coastal waters around the UK and at potential wave and tidal energy sites around the world.

Construction of the facility started late in 2010, and was completed in autumn 2013. The opening was on 5 June 2014, with the Energy Minister Amber Rudd officially opening the facility on 6 August 2014. The building was designed by Bennetts Associates architects, with structural and M&E support from Arup. In addition to the test tank, the facility includes a workshop, office and meeting space. The £10M construction cost of the facility was primarily funded by Engineering and Physical Sciences Research Council (EPSRC).

The facility was originally run by FloWave TT Ltd, a wholly owned subsidiary of the university. In 2017, the facility was integrated within the university's School of Engineering.

While the facility is not generally open to the public, the university and FloWave participate in Doors Open Days.

== Key clients and tests ==
Over the first ten years of operation, over 50 different renewable energy technologies were tested at the facility; this included floating wind turbines, tidal turbines including Orbital Marine Power, plus many wave energy devices. Some of the first developers to publicise that they have completed testing at FloWave, included Albatern with their WaveNET device, and QED Naval with their SubHub tidal platform.

In 2016, five of eight projects from the Wave Energy Scotland Novel Wave Energy Converter Call were tested at FloWave, with the others being tested in the towing tank at University of Strathclyde. These were Albatern's WaveNET Series 12, the AWS Ocean Energy Advanced Archimedes Waveswing, Mocean Energy, Joules Energy, and Quoceant with their Ectacti-hull.

In February 2019, The Slow Mo Guys released a film on their YouTube channel of the tank making a "spike" wave. This was shot on a Phantom high-speed camera at 1,000 frames per second. In 2022, researchers from the University of Oxford published a paper describing the behaviour of axisymmetric "spike waves" as they break, based on tests at FloWave.
