= List of wave power projects =

This article contains a list of proposed and prototype wave power devices, also called wave energy converters (WEC). Most of these are designed to work offshore or nearshore, although some concepts are mounted on the coast or in breakwaters.

A large number of concepts have been developed to various stages, with a 2013 review evaluating 172 different devices. Some of these have only been tested at small scale for short periods. Many of these technologies are no longer actively being developed. The projects with a section heading were reviewed and updated in mid-2024.

The projects in this list have been grouped into three categories:

1. Actively being developed
2. Not actively being developed, with no updates for a few years
3. Defunct technologies or companies

== Actively being developed ==
=== Azura wave power device tested in Hawaii ===
Azura Wave Power is based in New Plymouth, and has been developing wave energy since 2006. The TRL5/6 Azura wave power device was tested at the US Navy Wave Energy Test Site Kaneohe Bay, Hawaii. The 45-ton wave energy converter was located offshore, in a water depth of 30 metres (98 ft). It provided 20 kW of electrical power to the local grid for 18 months from September 2016. This concept was found to be too expensive, so Azura are now working on a smaller-scale device to produce both electricity and potable water.

=== Anaconda Wave Energy Converter ===
Developed by Checkmate SeaEnergy, based in Sheerness, the surface-following attenuator device is a long rubber tube which is tethered underwater. Passing waves will instigate a wave inside the tube, which will then propagates down its walls, driving a turbine at the far end. The full-scale device is expected to be around 200 metres (660 ft) long and 7 metres (23 ft) in diameter.

The Sustainable Energy Research Group at the University of Southampton were involved in developing the device, including tank testing a 1:30 scale model at the DHI basin. Checkmate SeaEnergy received funding between 2015 and 2017 from the Wave Energy Scotland Novel Wave Energy Converter programme stages 1 and 2 to further develop their concept. The company announced in January 2024 they plan to test a 1:12 scale model. In October 2025, Checkmate was awarded a £750,000 grant from Innovate UK to further develop the Lobe-Tendon Anaconda wave energy converter. The project, called Môr Neidr from the Welsh for sea snake, includes Swansea University, CGEN Engineering, the Offshore Renewable Energy Catapult and Wave Venture. Over18 months they plan to conduct numerical modelling, tank trials, materials testing and construct a 1:4-scale prototype section.

=== CalWave ===
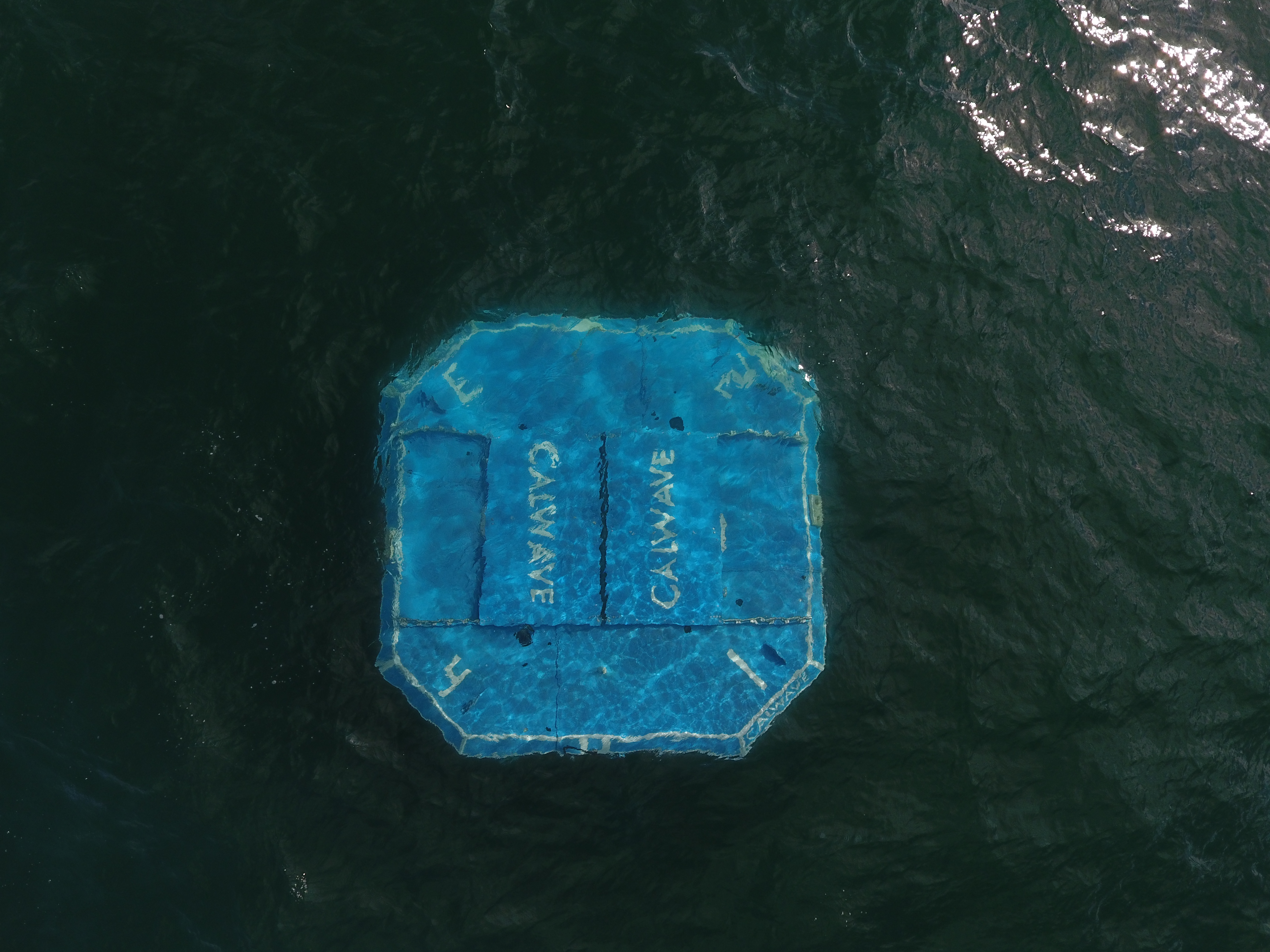
CalWave x1 WEC Pilot Unit

CalWave Power Technologies, Inc. based in California, is developing a submerged pressure differential wave energy device, which can operate at various water depths and distance from shore. The company tested a 1:20 scale prototype in 2016.

In September 2021, CalWave commissioned its pilot x1 device off the coast of San Diego. The testing was planned to last 6 months, but was extended to 10 months. CalWave expect to test a 100 kW x100 device at PacWave off the coast of Oregon.

In March 2024, CalWave was selected to be the technology used in an indigenous-led project in Yuquot, British Columbia. The Mowachaht/Muchalaht First Nations project has funding from the TD Bank Group, and aims to be a first-of-the-kind project for coastal community micro-grids powered by wave energy.

=== CETO ===
CETO is a submerged point-absorber buoy tethered to the seabed, developed by the Australian company Carnegie Clean Energy Ltd.

In 2008, a CETO5 was tested off Fremantle, Western Australia. This device consists of a single piston pump attached to the sea floor with a float (buoy) tethered to the piston. Waves cause the float to rise and fall, generating pressurized water, which is piped to an onshore facility to drive hydraulic generators or run reverse osmosis water desalination.

Irish subsidiary, CETO Wave Energy Ireland, is further developing the CETO technology in the EuropeWave project. In April 2024, they secured a berth at BiMEP in northern Spain to test there in 2025.

=== Crestwing ===
Danish company Crestwing ApS is developing a hinged-raft surface-following attenuator WEC. The device consists of two floats connected by a hinge and uses the atmospheric pressure acting on its large surface to stick to the ocean. This allows it to follow the waves, using the motion of the two floats to convert both kinetic and potential energy to electricity by a mechanical power take-off system.

In 2014, a 1:5 scale model was tested in the sea near Frederikshavn. In 2017 the successor, a full-scale prototype was ready to be tested. It was claimed the device will break the waves and draw the power from it in such a way, it gives it an extra function as a coastal protection device in exposed coastal areas.

In 2023, Cresting partnered with Aalborg University (AAU), Shipcon, and Logimatic Engineering to further develop the technology, including further tank testing at the AAU Wind and Wave laboratory in Esbjerg.

=== HiWave-5 ===
HiWave-5 is an array demonstration project by Swedish developer CorPower Ocean, to deploy, demonstrate and certify an array of point-absorber WECs at the Aguçadoura test site in Portugal. The project is being conducted in phases, (1) a single C4 full-scale device, and (2) an array with three additional C5 devices. The timescales for these were initially 2019 to 2022, and 2022 to 2024 respectively, however this appears to have slipped somewhat. A 300 kW rated power C4 was deployed at sea in September 2023.

=== Indian Institute of Technology, Madras, Wave Energy Program ===
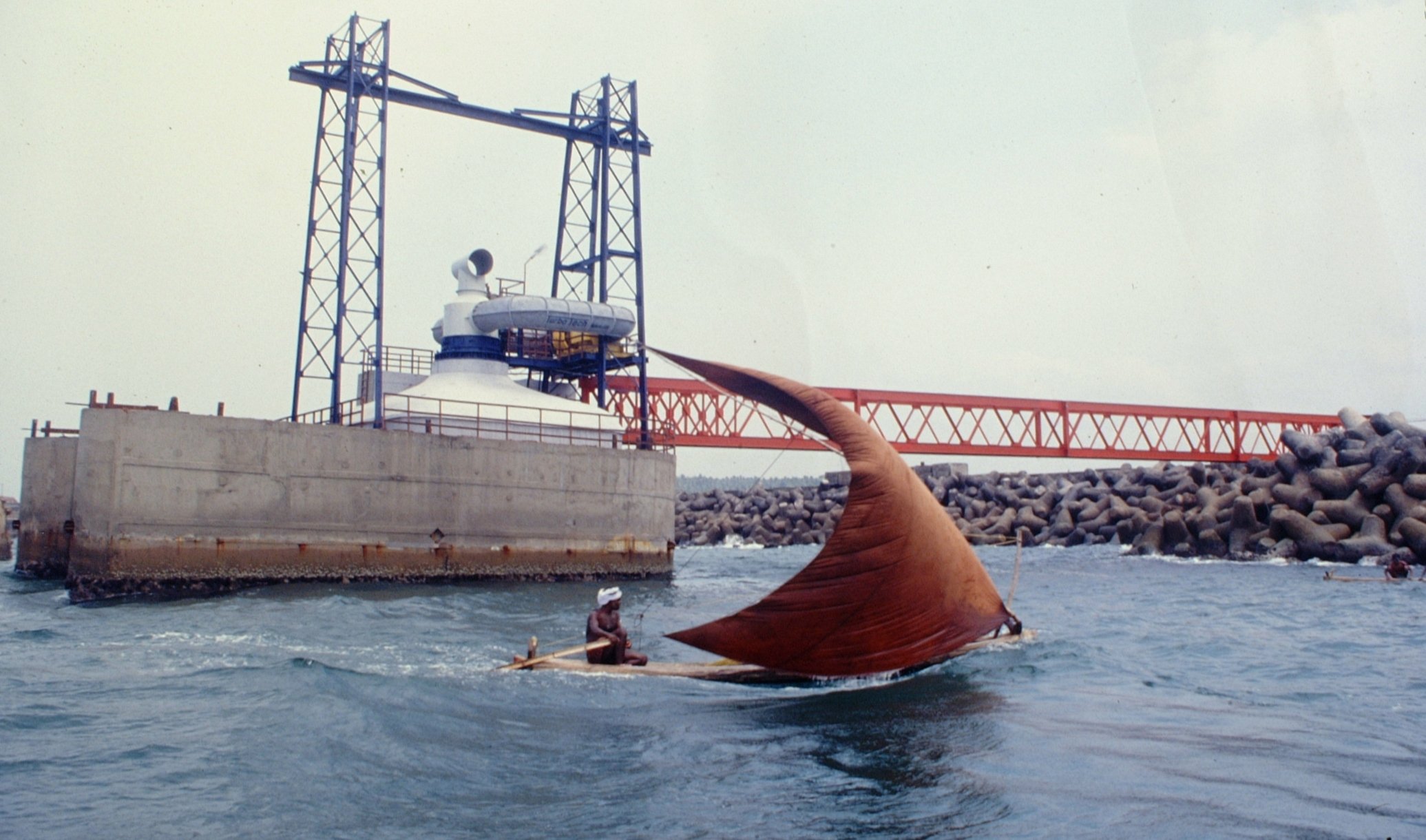
150kW Indian OWC Caisson

The Wave Energy Group at Ocean Engineering, Indian Institute of Technology IIT Madras, funded by the Department of Ocean Development, Government of India built, operated, instrumented, and tested a 150 kW oscillating water column (OWC). This was a nearshore bottom-standing caisson built in 1991, with different turbines tested over a period of multiple decades. It was located in Vizhinjam, Kerala, and provided power to the grid, however it was eventually decommissioned. Since the wave power in the equatorial region where this device was tested was low about 13 kW/m, the choice was for a multi-functional breakwater unit that could provide a safe harbor for fishing vessels and produce power more economically by sharing the costs of the structure. Electric power pumped to the grid was demonstrated. The group has also researched directly producing desalinated water and thermal storage using refrigeration. These technologies alleviate the need for an electric grid and demonstrate alternate power generation appropriate for the location.

In November 2022, a team from IIT Madras demonstrated the Sindhuja-I ocean wave energy converter about 6 kilometres (3.7 mi; 3.2 nmi) off the coast of Tuticorin, Tamil Nadu. Located in a water depth of 20 metres (66 ft), it produces only 100 watts of power, but the researchers hope to scale this up to a megawatt.

=== Lysekil Project ===
The Lysekil Project is an ongoing wave energy research project by the Centre for Renewable Electric Energy Conversion at Uppsala University in Sweden. It is located to the south of Lysekil, on the west coast approximately 100 km (62 mi) north of Gothenburg. The first WEC was deployed in 2006, and as of February 2024 there were 11 WECs located on the site, with a total capacity of 260 kW.

The WECs are point-absorber buoys, with a direct-drive linear generator placed on the seabed, connected to a buoy at the surface via a line. The movements of the buoy drive the translator in the generator.

=== Ocean Grazer WEC ===
The Ocean Grazer concept has been developed by the University of Groningen in The Netherlands since 2014, and now by a spin-out company Ocean Grazer BV. Wave energy is captured with multiple hydraulic pistons linked to floating buoys. Other sources of energy capture could also be used. These convert the motion of the sea into hydraulic head, which in turn drives a hydroelectric turbine.

As of May 2024, Ocean Grazer appear to be focusing on their "Ocean Battery" undersea pumped-storage hydropower concept, working with consultant engineers Stantec.

=== Ocean Power Technologies PowerBuoy ===
The PowerBuoy is a point absorber WEC developed by US-based firm Ocean Power Technologies (OPT) since 1997. The rise and fall of the waves moves a rack and pinion within the buoy and spins a generator. The electricity is transmitted by a submerged transmission line. The buoys are designed to be installed one to five miles (8 km) offshore in water 100 to 200 feet (30 to 60 m) deep. In September 2024, OPT completed over four months of offshore testing in New Jersey.

=== OE Buoy ===
The OE Buoy is a floating oscillating water column WEC with an air turbine, developed by Ocean Energy Ltd. in Cork, Ireland since 2002. A 1/4 scale device was tested at the Ocean Energy Test Site in Galway Bay between December 2006 and September 2009. A full-scale OE35 buoy is to be tested at the US Navy's Wave Energy Test Site in Hawaii, albeit delayed since the original 2019 plans. It is also proposed to test a further OE35 at EMEC in 2025.

=== Panthalassa Ocean-2 ===
Panthalassa, based in Portland, Oregon, is developing a deep water wave energy concept called the Ocean-2. The device has a spherical top section about 30 feet (10 m) in diameter mounted on top of a roughly 200 feet (61 m) long tubular hull. As it moves in the waves, water is forced up to the top and drains back through a turbine. The company plan to deploy multiple of these "nodes" in the open ocean, possibly generating hydrogen. A test of the device in the Puget Sound in 2025 resulted in it generating up to 50 kW in decent wave conditions. The Ocean-2 was previously tested in 2024 in the Strait of Juan de Fuca, and the smaller Ocean-1 device in the same location in 2021.

=== Seaturns ===
French company Seaturns is developing a concept to harness wave power using a water pendulum. Waves cause air to flow between two chambers via a turbine. The company tested a 1:4 sale prototype at the IFREMER test site in Brest for 18 months between 2023 and 2025. They raised €2.45m in crowdfunding towards a full-scale demonstrator. This will be tested in the Gironde estuary near Bordeaux, where the company is based.

=== WavePiston ===
WavePiston is a concept to harness wave power using a long string with collector plates that move with the waves. Hydraulic pumps between the plates pump seawater onshore, where it can either drive a turbine to create electricity or be used in desalination. The first full-scale device was installed off the coast of Gran Canaria in 2024.

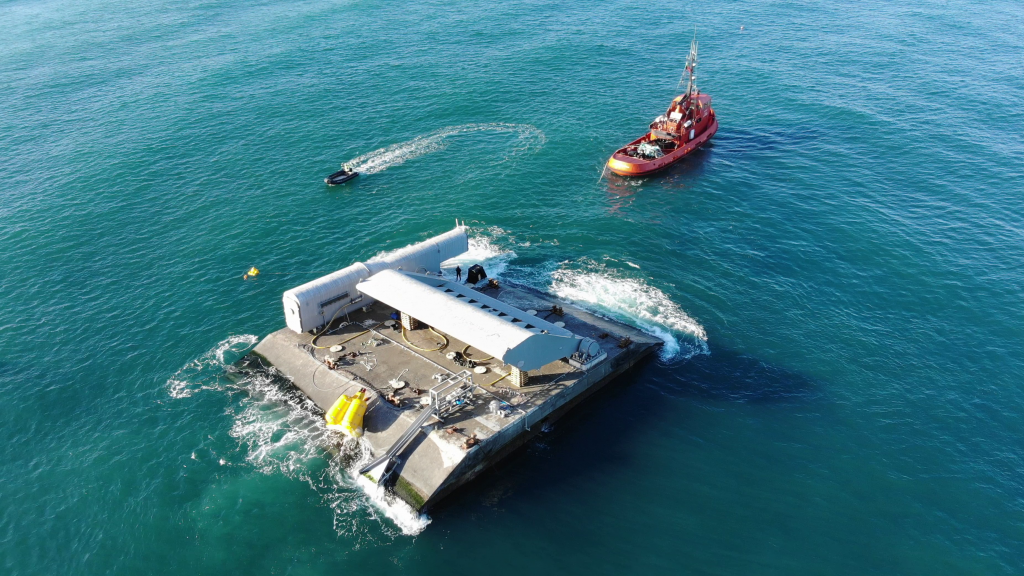

=== WaveRoller ===
Developed by Finnish company AW-Energy, the device is submerged hinged flap, or oscillating wave surge converter (OWSC). The back and forth movement of surging nearshore waves moves the plate. The kinetic energy transferred to this plate is collected by a piston pump. A half-scale demonstration device was tested off the coast of Peniche, Portugal in 2012, with a full-scale device tested at the same location between 2019 and 2021.

=== Zoex Power ===
An Aberdeen-based company is developing a modular WEC that can be mounted on harbours or other platforms. The devices consists of a float connected via a double link arm to a linear generator. A 100 kW prototype was tested for two weeks in 2024 at the Port of Aberdeen, South Harbour. Further tests of the device in Ordu, Turkey were conducted in 2025. The company was founded in 2020 by Turkish engineer Ash Penley, named after her children Zoe and Alex.

== Not actively being developed ==
The following projects or technologies do not appear to actively being developed, with no updates in several years, however formal announcement of cessation is not clear.

=== 40South Energy ===
40South Energy developed an underwater attenuator WEC since 2010. These machines work by extracting energy from the relative motion between one Upper Member and one Lower Member, following an innovative method which earned the company one UKTI Research & Development Award in 2011. A first generation full-scale prototype for this solution was tested offshore in 2010, and a second generation full-scale prototype was tested offshore during 2011. In 2012 the first units were sold to clients in various countries, for delivery within the year. The first reduced scale prototypes were tested offshore during 2007, but the company decided to remain in a "stealth mode" until May 2010. The company initially considered installing at Wave Hub in 2012, but that project never progressed. The R38/50 kW is rated at 50 kW while the R115/150 kW is rated at 150 kW.

In 2015, 40South Energy announced they were planning to test two 50 kW H50 devices in Marina di Pisa, Tuscany, Italy. H-WEP1 was deployed in September 2018, operated and managed by Enel Green Power.

=== Albatern WaveNET ===
Albatern Ltd was established in 2010 to develop the WaveNET multi-point-absorber array, based in Roslin, Midlothian. Development of the technology has stalled since 2016.

The WaveNET comprises multiple "Squid" units which are coupled into an array, reportedly giving a non-linear increase in power, with the array extracting energy from multiple waves passing through. Each of the Squid units has three buoyant floats attached to a central post via rigid linking arms. These have articulating pump units at either end that generate hydraulic power, which is then converted to electrical power. The units tested "Series-6" had a central post 6 metres (20 ft) high and generated 7.5 kW per Squid unit. A larger Series-12 was in development, 12 m high with a rated power of 75 kW. The company expected to further scale up in future to Series-24 at 24 m high and 750 kW, with 135 units in an array covering 250 m by 1250 m producing 100 MW.

In 2014, Albatern were working with their third iteration devices with a 14-week deployment on a Scottish fish-farm site, and a 6 unit array deployment for full characterisation at Kishorn Port in 2015. Initially working with smaller devices and arrays, the company was targeting off grid markets where diesel generation is presently used in offshore fish farms, coastal communities and long endurance scientific platforms. Demonstration projects were under development for fish-farm sites and an island community.

In November 2015, Albatern received funding through stage 1 of the Wave Energy Scotland Novel Wave Energy Converter programme for their WaveNET Series-12. They did not progress to stage 2.

=== AMOG, AEP WEC ===
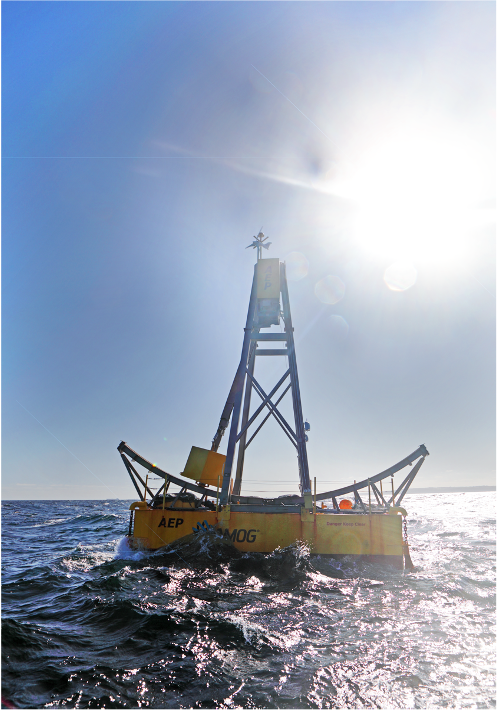
The AMOG Wave Energy Converter (WEC), in operation off SW England (2019)

The AMOG, AEP WEC is a surface dynamic vibration absorber, it has a barge shaped hull with an in-air pendulum tuned to absorb the wave motion. It is developed by an Australian engineering company called AMOG Consulting. The device was named AEP WEC after Professor Andrew E Potts, who founded AMOG Consulting.

A 1/3rd scale device was successfully deployed in the European 2019 summer at FaBTest, in Falmouth Bay, Cornwall, UK. Financial support for the deployment came from the Marine-i scheme under the European Union Regional Development Grant and Cornwall Development Company. The device was built by Mainstay Marine in Wales, installed by KML from SW England. A power take-off (PTO) is situated on top of the pendulum with electricity generated and dissipated locally through immersion heaters submerged in the seawater. The device's maximum rating is 75 kW.

The pendulum is a tuned mass damper that captures kinetic energy as the device moves. One of the claimed benefits of this device is that it has no moving parts below the water line. Smaller scale models were also tested in tanks at AMC/University of Tasmania and the University of Plymouth COAST basin.

=== Atmocean ===
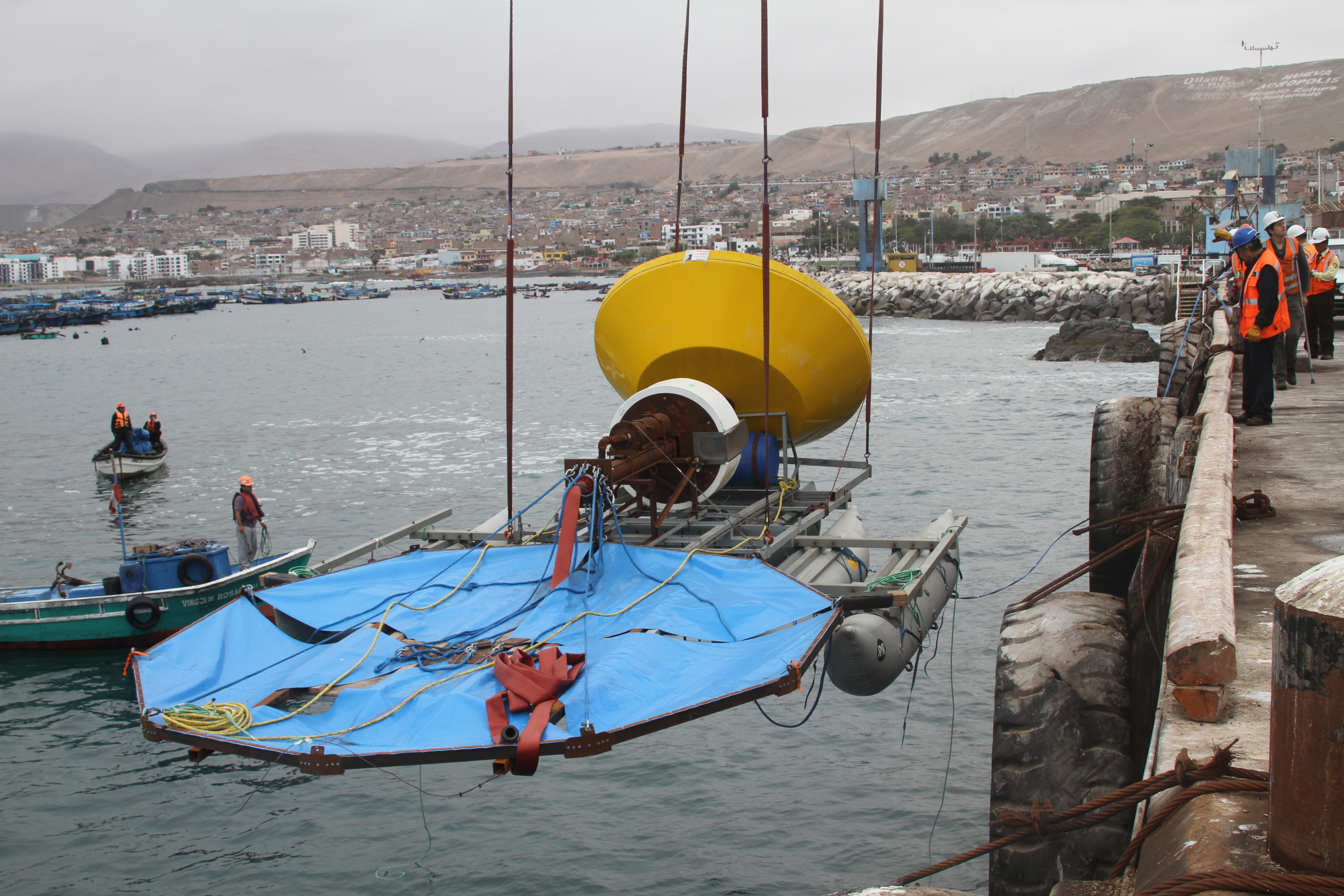
Single Atmocean pump being deployed in Ilo, Perú (2015)

Atmocean Inc., based in Santa Fe, New Mexico, USA developed an array of small buoys that capture wave energy for a zero-electricity reverse/osmosis (ZER/O) system.

The Atmocean array consists of 15, 3m diameter surface buoys. Instead of direct seafloor connections, the entire array is anchored at 6 points. Each buoy uses passing waves to pump seawater into the system and send it onshore where it goes directly into a reverse osmosis desalination process without the need for an external energy source. Advantages of smaller modular system include using standard shipping containers and small boat operations.

Two full scale trials were deployed off the coast of Ilo, Peru in 2015, for three weeks and six months respectively.

=== Cycloidal Wave Energy Converter ===
The Cycloidal Wave Energy Converter is a wave energy concept being developed by Atargis Energy Corporation in Colorado. The patents were filed in 2005, and the company was founded in 2010, after initial research showed potential. It is a fully submerged wave termination device, located offshore, with a direct drive generator.

It has reached the tank testing stage of development. The proposed device would be a 20 metres (66 ft) diameter fully submerged rotor with two hydrofoils. Numerical studies have shown greater than 99% wave power termination capabilities. These were confirmed by experiments in a small 2D wave flume, as well as a large offshore wave basin.

In November 2019, Atargis Energy was awarded funding by the US Department of Energy for a three-year project to further develop and demonstrate the concept.

=== Energen Wave Power ===
The Energen device was a concept for a near-shore attenuator. It consists of a series of semi-submerged cylindrical pivoting torque tubes connected to two large cylindrical pontoons. The wave-induced movement of these torque tubes is resisted by a hydraulic system which pumps high pressure oil through hydraulic motors. The hydraulic motors drive electrical generators to produce electricity.

A 50th scale model has been tested at the Council for Scientific and Industrial Research in Stellenbosch, South Africa. Using actual wave data off the South African coast it was estimated that a single device would produce 1.4 MW of power, or 979 GWh of electricity per annum.

A 2019 review of wave energy companies listed the development stage as closed.

=== FlanSea (Flanders Electricity from the Sea) ===
FlanSea was a three-year research project that commenced in 2010, between the Ghent University and six Flemish enterprises. The aim was to develop a point absorber buoy developed for use in the southern North Sea conditions, with moderate wave conditions. It works by means of a cable tethered to the seabed that due to the bobbing effect of the buoy, spools a cable around a winch and generates electricity.

Between April and December 2013, a "Wave Pioneer" device was tested near the Port of Ostend. This device was 4.4 m in diameter, 5 m high, and weighed 25 tonnes. In 2014, there were plans for a Wave Pioneer II.

=== Neptune Wave Engine ===
The Neptune Wave Engine has been developed by Neptune Equipment Corp. in Vancouver, Canada since 2010, when they found they were not able to purchase a wave power system for their cottage.

Wave energy is captured with multiple float-pistons constrained to move vertically up and down piles, informally called "doughnut on a stick". Reciprocation motion of float-piston is converted to one way rotation motion by patented direct-drive PTO with allows for power to be applied to generator from both the up and down strokes. It has multiple point absorbers, and is designed to work near shore, in small waves, 0.1 to 5 m (4 in. to 16 ft.).

By 2017, five full-size test units had been deployed, page 55. The sixth, deployed September 24–25, 2019 includes the "Vancouver Wave Energy Testing Station" for 3rd parties to verify with their own equipment that the corporation's claims for continuous "firm" electricity output and to verify how much electricity is output from waves of various sizes.

In 2021, the latest version was tested, with a 3 metres (10 ft) diameter, 2 metres (7 ft) deep float that weighs 10 tonnes. It is capable of producing up to 20 kW, but has only ever produced 12 kW and that was during a storm, typically it produces 1–4 kW.

=== Parasitic Power Pack (P3) ===
The Parasitic Power Pack (P3) was developed in 2007–2008, by Paul Mario Koola at Knowledge Based Systems, Inc. (KBSI). It was designed to provide power for “free floating” buoy systems deployed in Distributed Sensor Networks by the submarine fleet of the U.S. Navy. It was designed to produce a steady power output of 40 milliwatts from wave motion, with a capacity to store at least 60 joules of energy. It was patented in 2009.

=== Sea Power ===
Sea Power Ltd is an Irish company based in Enniscrone, County Sligo, developing the Surface-following attenuator Seapower device since 2008. In October 2016, Sea Power planned to deploy a 1/4 scale prototype at the Marine & Renewable Energy Test Site in Galway Bay.

The Sea Power Platform was developed within the Wave Energy Scotland Novel Wave Energy Converter call stages 1 and 2 between 2015 and 2017, including tank testing at the FloWave Ocean Energy Research Facility.

By 2019, Sea Power had teamed up with MarkZero Prototypes, based in Connecticut, for the "wave to water" programme run by the US Department of Energy.

=== SINN Power wave energy converter ===
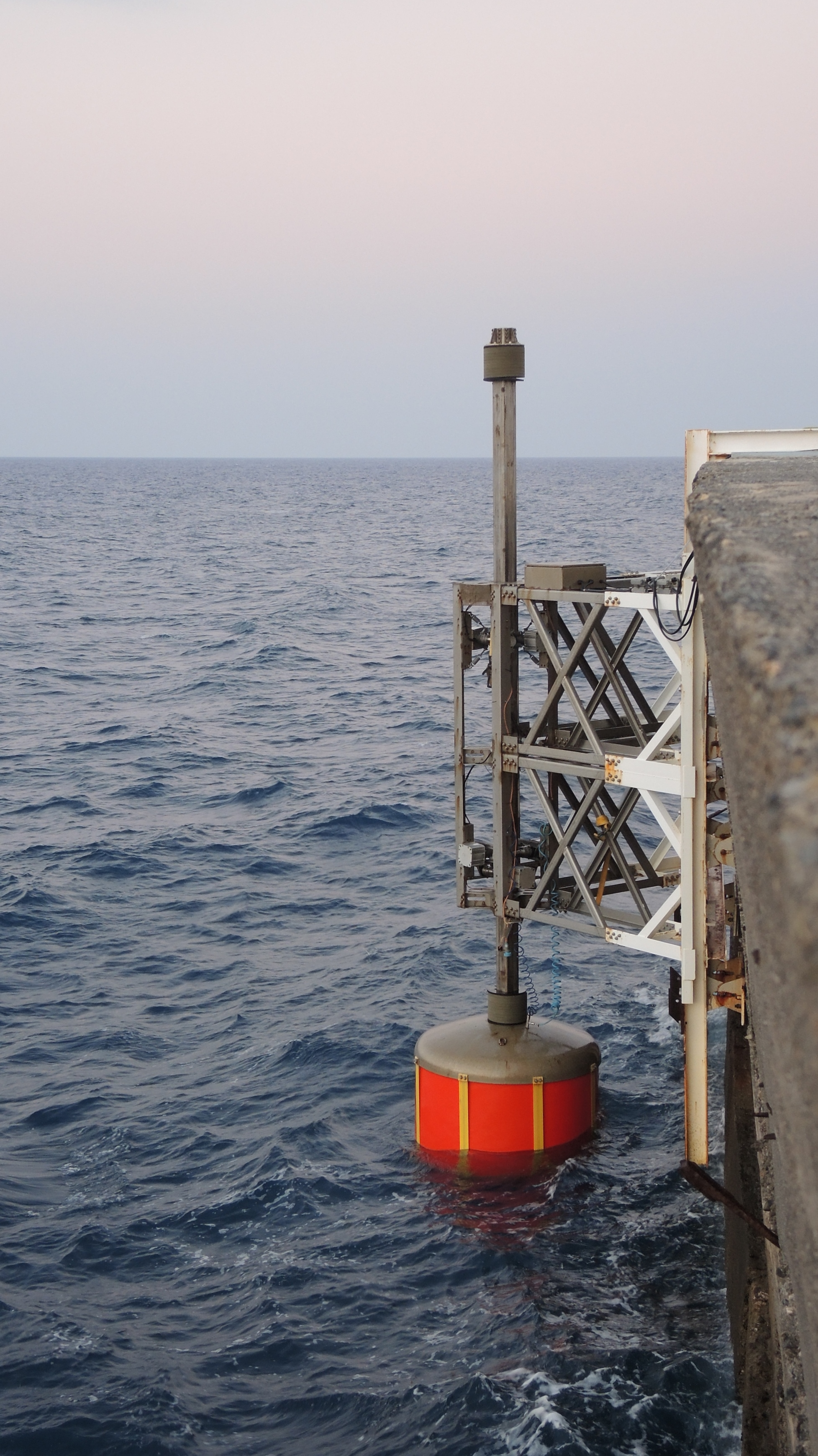
SINN Power wave energy converter (single module) on Crete in August 2016

German company SINN Power GmbH developed a wave energy converter from 2014, however the company is now focused on solar power.

The SINN Power WEC consists of a variable number of buoys which are attached to an inflexible steel frame. Electricity is generated when the up-and-down motion of the waves lifts the buoys. The floating bodies lift a rod that runs through a linear generator unit.

Since 2015, SINN Power is testing a single wave energy converter module on the Greek island of Crete. In 2018, two next-generation devices were installed, all mounted on the breakwater at Heraklion Harbour. In 2020, the company published a video of the devices in action.

SINN Power had plans to build a floating version, with 18 modules. By 2020, the concept had developed into a modular floating platform for solar, wind, and wave energy.

=== SRI International Electroactive Polymer ===
A type of wave buoy, built using an Electroactive Polymer Artificial Muscle (EPAM) was developed by SRI International. In 2008, they tested a buoy with the EPAM in Monterey Bay, however the power output was only five watts. The EPAM was a type of dielectric elastomer that contracts in response to electricity, and thus can also be used to generate electricity.

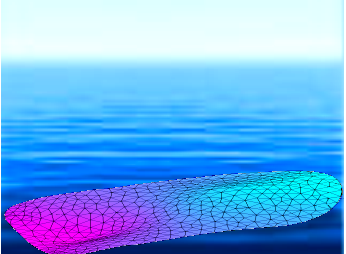

=== Wave Carpet ===
Wave Carpet is a concept for a very large flexible floating structure to harness wave energy, developed in 2003 by Paul Mario Koola at Knowledge Based Systems, Inc. (KBSI), with funding from the US Navy. The proposed device would comprise a very large rubber mat, square kilometres in size, which would be much larger than the size of the wavelength, and thus the opposite of a "point absorber" type WEC. The conversion of mechanical to electrical energy could be by smart materials, such as Piezoelectricity or Dielectric polymers.

The concept was claimed to have low lifecycle cost and be easier to deploy and maintain due to the self-propulsion by advanced controls with minimal tug power. It was also claimed to act as a wave damper thereby sharing the cost of power generated.

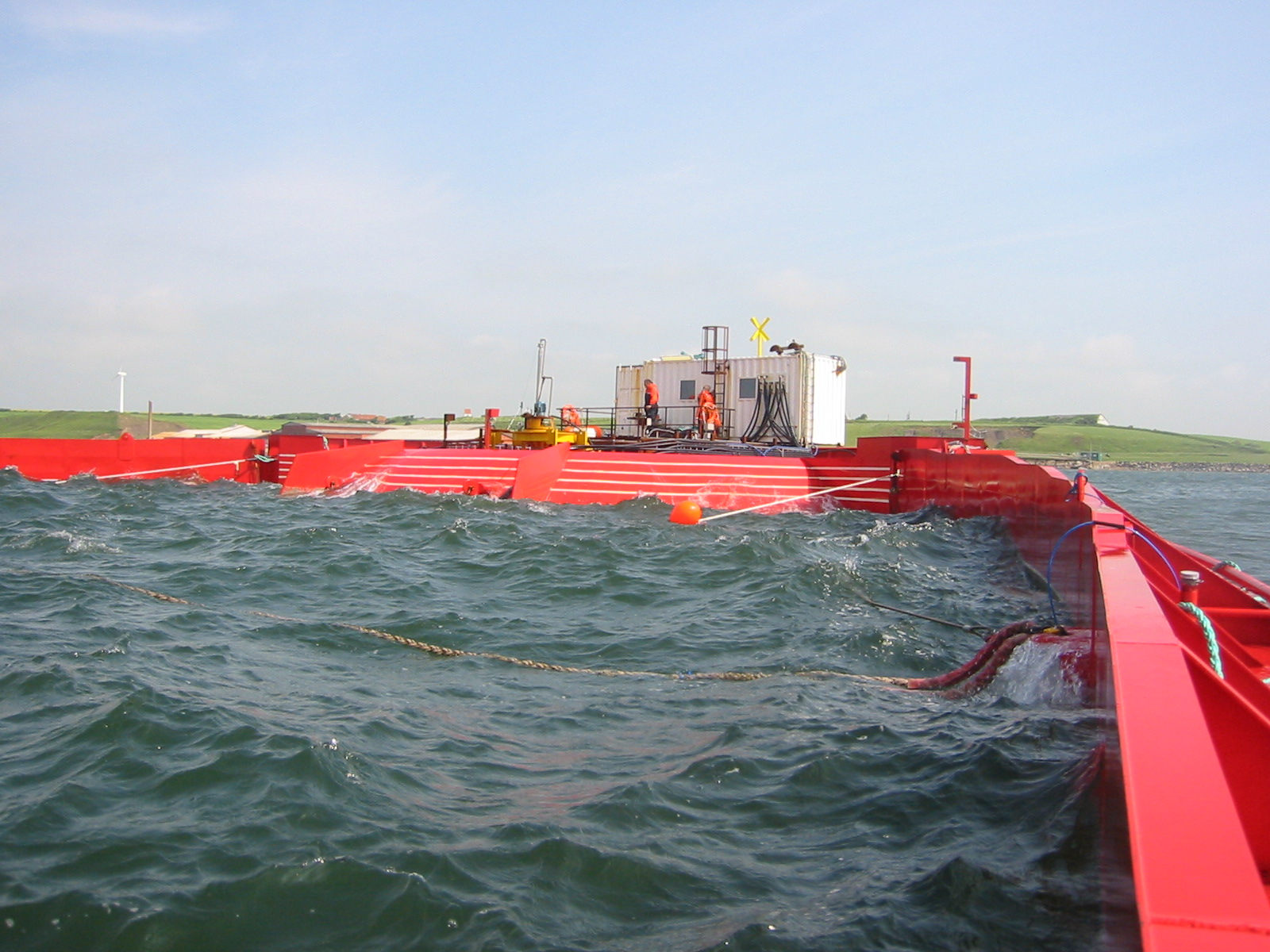
Wave Dragon seen from reflector, prototype 1:4½ scale

=== Wave Dragon ===
The Wave Dragon is an overtopping WEC concept developed in Denmark since 1998, with a 1:4.5 scale prototype tested between 2003 and 2010. With the Wave Dragon, large wing reflectors focus waves up a ramp into an offshore reservoir. The water returns to the ocean by the force of gravity via hydroelectric generators.

In May 2003, it became the first offshore wave energy converter, connected to the Danish electricity grid.

=== Waves4Power WaveEL ===
Waves4Power is a Swedish developer of buoy based OWEC (Offshore Wave Energy Converter) systems. A 100 kW prototype was tested at the grid-connected Runde test site in Norway between 2016 and 2018.

=== Zyba Renewables — CCell ===
Zyba Renewables Ltd. is a UK based wave energy developer.

The CCell is a directional WEC consisting of a curved flap operating mainly in the surge direction of wave propagation. Being curved gives the device two advantages over flat paddle oscillating wave surge converters: the energy is dissipated over a long arc reducing the wave height, and the shape cuts through the waves which reduces turbulence on the boundaries. In addition, unlike other oscillating wave surge converters, the latest version of CCell is designed to float just under the water surface, maximising the available wave energy. The developers claim this makes CCell the world's most efficient wave energy device.

Zyba was awarded funding by Wave Energy Scotland for Stage 1 of the Novel Wave Energy Convertor call in 2015, but the project did not progress to Stage 2.

In 2017, Zyba partnered with Biorock to produce artificial coral reefs using wave energy.

== Defunct, decommissioned or company no longer trading ==
The following projects have formally ceased, been decommissioned, or the company is no longer trading.

=== AWS-III ===
The AWS-III was developed by Scottish company AWS Ocean Energy between 2008 and 2014. However, they subsequently revisited their original Wave Swing concept.

The AWS-III concept was a floating toroidal vessel. Rubber membranes on the outer faces would deform as waves pass, moving air inside chambers which in turn drive air-turbines to generate electricity. AWS Ocean tested a 1/9 scale model in Loch Ness in 2010. The full sized version was planned to be 60m across and generate 2.5 MW, installed in offshore farms moored in around 100m depth of water.

=== AquaBuOY ===
The AquaBuOY was a point-absorber WEC developed by Finavera Renewables Inc.

In September 2007, the AquaBuOY 2.0 was deployed approximately 2.5 miles (4.0 km; 2.2 nmi) off the coast of Newport, Oregon. The device used hose-pumps, a high pressure accumulator, and a Pelton hydro turbine to convert wave motion into electrical power.

In 2009 Finavera Renewables surrendered its wave energy permits from FERC. In July 2010 Finavera announced that it had entered into a definitive agreement to sell all assets and intellectual property related to the AquaBuOY wave energy technology.

=== Islay LIMPET ===
The Islay LIMPET was a shoreline oscillating water column wave power station located on Islay, Scotland. It generated power to the national grid between 2000 and 2012, after which it was decommissioned. It used the motion of the incoming waves to drive air in and out of a concrete pressure chamber through a Wells turbine.

=== Oceanlinx ===
Oceanlinx was an Australian company that developed shoreline and offshore oscillating water column wave energy plants with variable-pitch bladed air turbines.

Several prototypes were testes at Port Kembla in New South Wales from 2005. The third medium scale demonstration unit near Port Kembla, was grid connected in early 2010. In May 2010, the wave energy generator snapped from its mooring lines in extreme seas and sank on Port Kembla's eastern breakwater.

A 1 MW "GreenWave" prototype was constructed in Port Adelaide, intended to be installed in Port MacDonnell some 450 kilometres (280 mi) south-east. However, during transport in March 2014, rough seas caused damage to the air bags floating the 3000 tonne concrete structure and it sank, damaging it beyond repair.

Founded in 1997 as Energetech, it rebranded as Oceanlinx in 2007 and went into liquidation in 2014 following the GreenWave incident.

=== OWEL ===
Ocean Wave Energy Ltd (OWEL) developed a floating offshore wave surge converter type WEC, receiving funding from Innovate UK between 2011 and 2016 to develop the concept and test at Wave Hub.

The device consists of a floating tapered duct, with the large end open to capture incoming waves. The surging motion of long period waves compresses air in the duct, which is then used to drive a uni-directional air turbine mounted on top of the floating vessel. The design of a full scale demonstration project was completed in Spring 2013, ready for fabrication, however this does not appear to have happened.

=== Oyster wave energy converter ===
Aquamarine Power developed and tested two versions of their Oyster WEC, an oscillating wave surge converter. This was a hinged mechanical flap attached to the seabed that captured the energy of nearshore waves. It drove hydraulic pistons to deliver high pressure water to an onshore turbine which generates electricity. In November 2009, the first full-scale demonstrator Oyster began producing power at the European Marine Energy Centre's wave test site at Billia Croo in Orkney. In 2015, Aquamarine entered administration.

=== Pelamis Wave Energy Converter ===
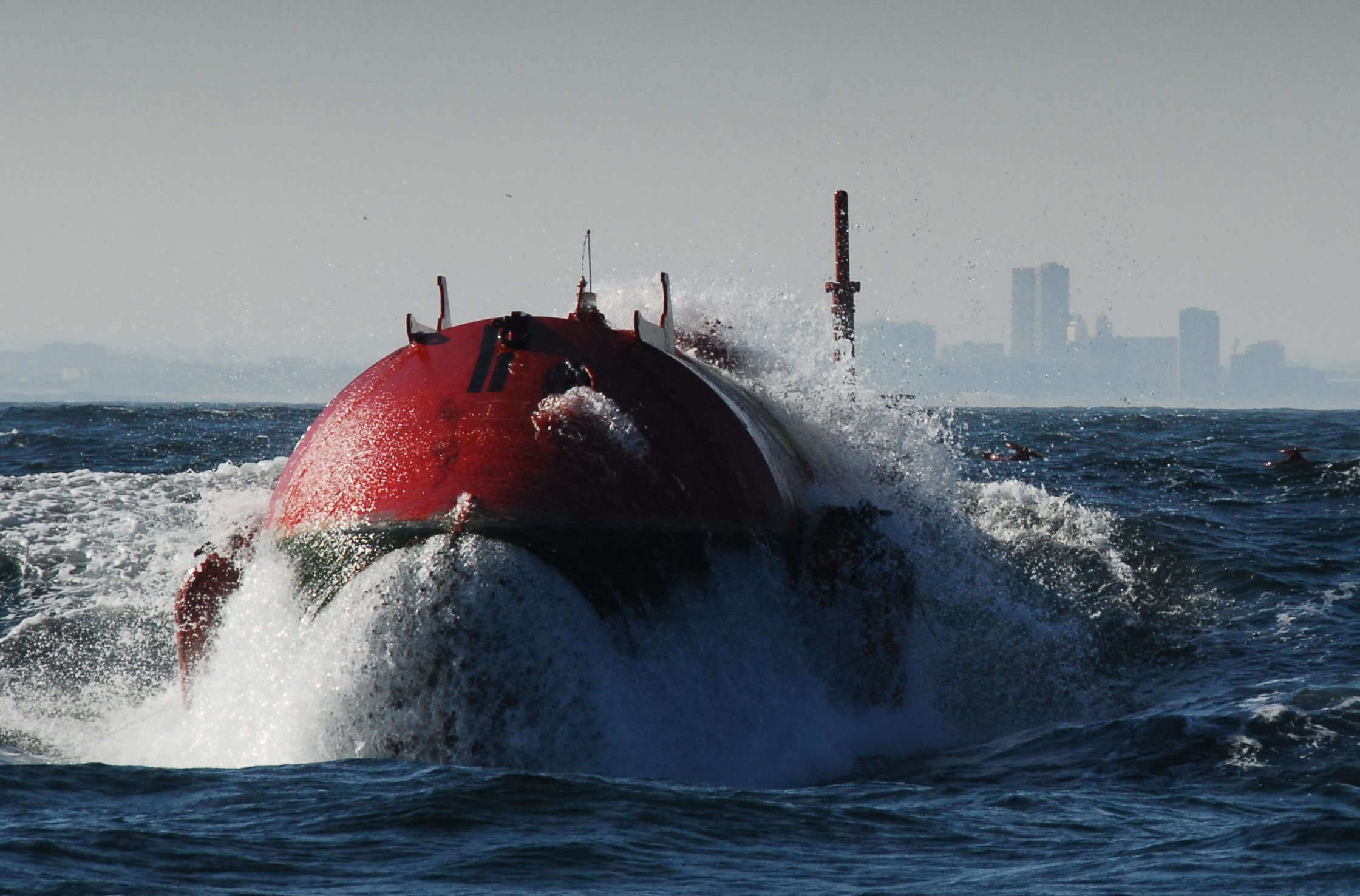
Agucadoura Wave Farm in Portugal, first commercial application of the Pelamis design (2008)

Edinburgh-based Pelamis Wave Power developed multiple iterations of their Pelamis "Sea Snake" WEC. As waves pass along a series of semi-submerged cylindrical sections linked by hinged joints, the sections move relative to one another. This motion activates hydraulic cylinders which pump high pressure oil through hydraulic motors which drive electrical generators. The first working Pelamis machine was installed in 2004 at the European Marine Energy Center (EMEC) in Orkney. Here, it became the world's first offshore wave energy device to generate electricity into a national grid anywhere in the world. The later P2, owned by E.ON, started grid connected tests off Orkney in 2010. The company went into administration in November 2014, and the device is no longer being developed.

=== Sanze shoreline gully ===
This was a 40 kW Oscillating Water Column (OWC) with tandem Wells turbines, constructed on the coast of Sanze, Tsuruoka, Japan in 1982. It was the first full-scale wave energy device constructed (apart from the French OWC installation on the top of a natural cliff in 1910, and operated for six months with good results. It was built in a shoreline gully; a naturally tapered channel that focuses the energy to the head where the device is located. It was decommissioned, probably as a result of the low average power output, of just 11 kW.

=== SDE Sea Wave ===
SDE Sea Wave was developed by an Israeli company of the same name between 1996 and 2014 when it was acquired by a Chinese company. A breakwater-based wave machine, this device utilises the vertical pumping motion of buoys operating hydraulic rams, thereby powering generators. One version ran from 2008 to 2010, producing 40 kWh.

=== SeaRaser ===
The SeaRaser concept was developed by Alvin Smith and Dartmouth Wave Energy, and attracted the attention of Ecotricity. The concept consisted of a piston pump(s) attached to the sea floor with a float (buoy) tethered to the piston. Waves cause the float to rise and fall, generating pressurized water, which is piped to reservoirs onshore which then drive hydro-electric turbines. The concept reached a technology readiness level of TRL4/5 in 2015, but there is no reported progress since.

=== Seatricity Oceanus ===
UK company Seatricity Ltd. developed the Oceanus WEC. The device consisted of a floating buoy which follows the waves and a piston pump tethered to the seabed. This pumps seawater to an onshore facility to drive hydraulic generators or run reverse osmosis water desalination.

An initial prototype was tested in the Atlantic Ocean off the coast of Antigua. This was followed by tests of a full-scale prototype Oceanus 1 at the EMEC Billia Croo site between 2013 and 2014. The Oceanus 2 was built by A&P Falmouth in 2014, deployed at Wave Hub in May 2016, and was a 162 kW machine. The Oceanus 2 device is the first and only device yet to have been deployed and tested at the UK's WaveHub test site as a full-scale prototype (2014-2016). This 3rd generation device consists of a single patented piston pump mounted on a gimbal and supported by an aluminium 12m diameter buoy/float.

Seatricity had plans for a 10 MW array comprising 60 devices, but this was never built. The company was dissolved in June 2022.

=== Sotenäs Wave Power Station ===
Seabased Industry AB in cooperation with Fortum and the Swedish Energy Agency is developed a wave power park, north-west of Smögen on the Swedish West coast. The first phase was deployed during the week commencing 23 March 2015 and comprises 36 wave energy converters and one substation. The WECs were located offshore, with a float on the surface connected to a linear generator on the seabed. The project ended by 2018 as funding ran out, although the generators are still in-situ as an artificial reef.

=== TapChan (tapered channel), ===
A demonstration plant was constructed by Norwave in 1985 at Toftestallen in Øygarden Municipality in Norway. Waves funnelled down the narrowing channel lifted water about 3 metres (10 ft) into a reservoir. Water then flowed back into the sea through a conventional Kaplan hydropower turbine and a 3-phase induction generator generated electricity for the local grid. This is classified as an overtopping terminator type WEC.

On average, the 370 kW Tapchan plant converted some 42 to 43% of the incident wave energy at the 55 m wide wave-collector into electricity. The plant worked very satisfactory for about 6 years before it was accidentally damaged in 1991, in an attempt to improve the shape of its channel, and has since not been restored.

A TapChan power plant was proposed in Indonesia, with a reservoir 4 m above sea level, and a rated power of around 1.1 to 1.5 MW. Feasibility studies were conducted in1987–88 by Norwave and Indonesian partners, which suggested wave power would be economically feasible in coastal villages without a grid connection.

=== Toftestallen OWC ===
The Toftestallen oscillating water column (OWC) was built alongside the TapChan in Øygarden, Norway. Constructed by Kværner Brug AS in 1985, the plant had a 500 kW self-rectifying Wells turbine with electric generator, and operated for four years before it was destroyed by a severe winter storm. It was constructed into the cliff face, from concrete up to a level of +3.5 m with a 20 m high steel structure above.

=== Wave Star ===
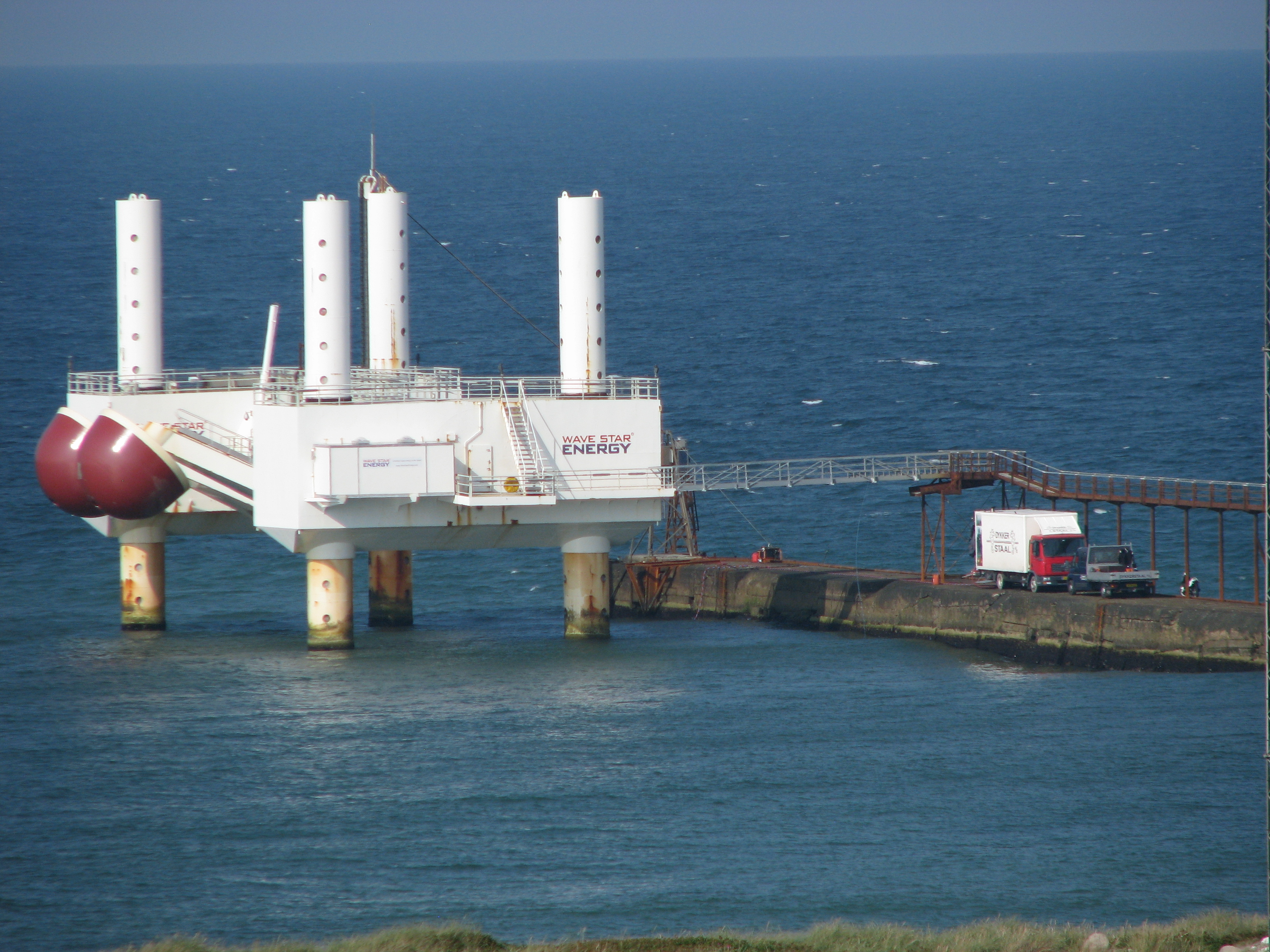
The 1:2 scale Wave Star machine in Hanstholm.

Danish company Wave Star A/S developed a multi-point-absorber WEC between 2000 and 2016. The concept was invented by brothers Niels and Keld Hansen. Extensive tank testing with a 1:40 scale was undertaken at Aalborg University in 2001.

The Wavestar machine draws energy from wave power with floats that rise and fall with the up and down motion of waves. The floats are attached by arms to a platform that stands on legs secured to the sea floor. The motion of the floats is transferred via hydraulics into the rotation of a generator, producing electricity.

A 1:10 scale Wave Star was tested at Nissum Bredning, Denmark, between April 2006 and November 2011. It was 24 m long with 20× 1 m diameter floats on each side, a total of 40. It produced power from waves of 10 cm or more, with a peak power output of 5.5 kW.

A 50 kW 1:2 scale Wave Star machine was then tested at Hanstholm Harbour, which produced electricity to the grid since September 2009. However, it was scrapped in 2016.

=== Wavebob ===
Wavebob was a point-absorber WEC which was developed in Ireland between 1999 and 2013, when the company ceased trading after running out of money.

The Wavebob buoy consisted of two main concentric parts, with power generated by their relative motion in the waves. It is an ocean-going heaving buoy, with a submerged tank which captures additional mass of seawater for added power and tunability, and as a safety feature (Tank "Venting") allowing it to ride out storms.

Wavebob conducted ocean trials at The Ocean Energy Test Site in Galway Bay, as well as extensive tank tests.

=== Waveplane ===
Waveplane was an offshore overtopping WEC concept developed in Denmark. A prototype, 20 m × 18 m × 8 m weighing 110 tonnes, was towed to Hanstholm for testing in March 2009 and temporarily moored, but ended up stranded on the shore the following day. The device was scrapped in 2012.

=== Wello Penguin ===
The Penguin WEC was developed by Finish company Wello Oy between 2008 and 2023. Two full-scale device were constructed, and tested in Scotland and Spain respectively, although both tests ended in difficulties. The first 0.5 MW device was deployed at the EMEC Billia Croo test site in Summer 2012. The unit was modified and reinstalled early 2017 as part of the Horizon 2020 funded Clean Energy From Ocean Waves (CEFOW) research project. A second device was tested in Spain from July to December 2021.

== Other ==
=== Wave Hub ===
Wave Hub is an offshore renewable energy research project for testing 3rd party devices, with a 'socket' sitting on the seabed for devices to be plugged into. It is located approximately 10 miles (16 km; 8.7 nmi) off the coast of Hayle, Cornwall, UK

After seven years of development, the hub was installed on the seabed in September 2010. It was originally developed for wave power, and the only device to have been tested there was Seatricity's Oceanus 2 device, however this was not grid connected. As of 2018 Wave Hub had failed to produce any grid-connected electricity.

The site was acquired by Swedish floating wind turbine developer Hexicon in 2021. They plan to test the TwinHub device there by 2025.
