= CorPower Ocean =

Swedish waver energy device developer

CorPower Ocean AB
- Industry: Wave power
- Founded: 2012; 14 years ago
- Headquarters: Stockholm, Sweden
- Key people: Patrik Möller (CEO); Stig Lundbäck (Inventor)
- Website: https://corpowerocean.com/

CorPower Ocean AB is a wave energy device developer, headquartered in Stockholm, Sweden. They also have offices in Oslo, Viana do Castelo, and Stromness. The office in Viana do Castelo is an R&D centre that also serves as the manufacturing and service centre for the wave energy converters (WEC).

The CorPower WEC is a point absorber device, fitted with a "WaveSpring" that allows the device to be tuned and detuned depending on the wave conditions, optimising power capture while improving survivability.

CorPower have tested several versions of their technology, most recently the commercial-scale C4 device in Aguçadora, Portugal launched in September 2023. Prior to this, they tested a half scale prototype C3 at EMEC in Orkney, Scotland in 2018/19.

== Device Concept ==
The CorPower WEC is a rotationally symmetrical point absorber, i.e. circular in plan. The concept was inspired by the human heart, invented in 2011 by cardiologist Stig Lundbäck. It is fitted with a "WaveSpring" technology developed at NTNU, that allows the device to be tuned and detuned depending on the wave conditions. This allows the device to move more in calm conditions, and move less during large waves during storms.

The device is anchored to the seabed by a "UMACK" pile, developed within the Universal Mooring, Anchor & Connectivity Kit Demonstration project. It uses a pneumatic pre-tensioning system to reduce the mass of the oscillating body, thus increasing its natural frequency. The natural state of the device is therefore detuned to the period of ocean waves.

The oscillating motion of the device is transformed to rotary motion for the generator by a cascade gearbox. The gearbox was developed at KTH Royal Institute of Technology, and features eight pinion wheels to share the forces from the rack evenly. It uses a similar design principle to a planetary gearbox.

The shell of the WEC is made from filament-wound glass reinforced plastic with a DIAB Divinycell H structural core. It is produced in a mobile system, that can be transported to construct the hull close to where the WEC will be deployed.

=== CorPack Arrays ===
CorPower plan to install arrays of about 25 devices, in what they call CorPack wave clusters. These will have a power output of about 10 MW, comparable to modern offshore wind turbines.

== History ==
The company was founded by Lundbäck and Möller in 2012, with funding from the European EIT InnoEnergy accelerator program. They are following a five-stage development plan, scaling up to commercial devices. Stages 1 and 2 comprised 1:30 and 1:16 scale model testing in 2012 and 2013-14, plus dry rig testing of a 1:3 scale power take off. Stage 3 involved 1:2 scale sea tests at EMEC in 2018. Stages 4 and 5 will be conducted in Portugal as part of the HiWave-5 project, this aims to prove the survivability, performance, and economics of an array of grid connected devices, with DNV providing type certification.

- Stage 4 involves demonstration and verification of a single C4 WEC, which will increase the technology readiness level from TRL6 to TRL7.
- Stage 5 will then involve demonstration and type certification of the pilot array, which is planned to additionally include three C5 WECs, and raise the TRL to 8.

The timescales for these were initially 2019 to 2022, and 2022 to 2024 respectively, however this appears to have slipped somewhat, as stage 5 has not commenced as of February 2025. In October 2022 they claimed to be finalising stage four.

In October 2024, CorPower announced they had secured €32 million in Series B funding, taking the total from public and private investors since the company was founded in 2012 to €95m. This was supplemented in February 2025 by funding of up to €17.5 million from the European Innovation Council EIC Accelerator, comprising a €2.5m grant combined with €15m pre-commitment in equity investment, resulting from the "Renewable energy sources and their whole value chain" challenge.

=== Initial development ===
Initial testing of the WaveSpring technology was conducted in November 2014 at Ecole Centrale de Nantes, France, in the Hydrodynamic and Ocean Engineering Tank.

=== C3 testing at EMEC ===
In 2018 CorPower tested a half-scale C3 device at the EMEC Scapa Flow scale test site, which is not grid connected. This HiWave-3 project was supported by the Wave Energy Scotland Novel Wave Energy Converter (NWEC) Stage 3 programme, the Swedish Energy Agency, InnoEnergy, and the Interreg NWE FORESEA project. The device was rated at 25 kW, was 4.3 m in diameter, and 10 m tall.

=== C4 testing at Aguçadoura ===
In 2020, CorPower secured a license from the Portuguese Directorate-General for Natural Resources (DGRM) to deploy devices offshore of Aguçadoura in northern Portugal as part of their HiWave-5 project. This is at the Aguçadoura test site previously used by Pelamis Wave Power for the Aguçadoura Wave Farm. A new 6.2 km long subsea cable was installed in 2022 by Maersk Supply Service, to provide communications and transmit power from an array of four devices back to shore.

The C4 device was deployed at Aguçadora in Portugal in September 2023. It was launched at the port of Viana do Castello, and towed to the site, 4 km offshore. It was connected to the seabed by a bespoke "UMACK" anchoring system, and connected to the Portuguese electricity grid by a subsea cable. Following a seven week commissioning period, the device started exporting power to the grid in October 2023. In this first phase of testing, peak power output of up to 600 kW was recorded, and upgrades in planned onshore servicing after this may increase this to 850 kW. It is planned to conduct a Power Performance Assessment phase in line with the IEC Technical Specification 62600-100.

The 300 kW rated power C4 WEC is 9 m in diameter, 19 m tall, and has a mass of around 60 tonnes. In February 2024, it was announced the device had survived 18.5 m high waves during Storm Domingos in November 2023.

In July 2026, DNV certified the C4 WEC.

Prior to deployment at sea, the C4 drivetrain was tested for a year in a purpose-built dry test rig at the companies factory in Västberga, Stockholm. This allowed the company to debug the system and tune the performance.

CorPower has partnered with the French company TotalEnergies to develop an array of devices at Aguçadora as part of the HiWave-5 project, which will see a further three CorPower WECs deployed in a small array. It was originally planned to manufacture these devices between 2022 and 2024, though this timeline was impacted by the COVID-19 pandemic.

== Future plans ==
In 2019, CorPower teamed up with project developer Simply Blue Group who want to develop projects in the UK and Ireland using the CorPower technology. It was hoped at that time to have projects exporting power by 2024.

Simply Blue together with Irish energy utility ESB are planning to deploy CorPower WECs off the coast of County Clare, Ireland in a project called Saoirse. As of September 2023, the plan is to install an array of about 5 MW approximately 4 km from the coast, to be constructed in 2028/2029.

Simply Blue applied in March 2023 for a license to deploy a CorPack wave cluster at the EMEC Billia Croo wave test site in Orkney. In May 2025, it was announced by Kate Forbes at the All-Energy conference in Glasgow that CorPower had signed a berth agreement with EMEC, bringing the 5 MW wave energy project one step closer. In December 2025, CorPower announced they would be leading a consortium awarded €19m Horizon Europe grant towards the €30m POWER-Farm EU project.
