= Mocean Energy =

Scottish wave technology company

- Founded: 2015; 11 years ago in Edinburgh, Scotland, UK
- Headquarters: Edinburgh, Scotland, United Kingdom
- Key people: Cameron McNatt (Founder and Managing Director); Chris Retzler (Founder and Technical Director)
- Products: Wave energy converters
- Website: mocean.energy

Mocean Energy Ltd. is a wave energy technology developer, based in Edinburgh and Aberdeen. They are developing a hinged-raft attenuator wave energy converter (WEC) at various scales for different markets.

Mocean received funding through the Wave Energy Scotland Novel Wave Energy Convertor (NWEC) calls to develop a series of small-scale prototypes, the largest device called Blue X had a rated power output of 10 kW and was tested at EMEC in 2021. This device was subsequently tested off the coast of Orkney in the 'Renewables for Subsea Power' (RSP) project.

The company is developing the next iteration Blue Horizon 250 WEC through the EuropeWave R&D programme.

== Device concept ==
Mocean is developing a floating hinged-raft WEC, which comprises two sections that can rotate around a central nacelle which contains a power take-off generator. As waves pass the device it flexes, with the middle moving up or down relative to the ends, and this motion is harvested to generate electricity. Unlike some other wave energy devices, the Mocean WEC is 'self-referenced', meaning it does not rely on a reaction against the mooring to generate power. This allows a more conventional mooring system, and for the WEC to be deployed in deep waters.

The device has a unique geometry that is designed to improve performance and also survivability by passing through large waves. The two sections are able to rotate freely with large hinge rotations, increasing survivability. The company uses software to explore various geometries, searching for optimal new shapes for the device allowing it to generate more power. The fore and aft sections are different to each in size and shape but both have sloping ends: this geometry is dissimilar to previous hinged raft concepts.

The Mocean WEC uses a lightweight modular generator developed by CGEN Engineering and the University of Edinburgh. The modular design means individual modules within the can be bypassed if a fault occurs and individually replaced using smaller equipment, rather than needing a full generator overhaul or replacement.

The floating device also has small solar panels mounted on it to increase the amount of power generated.

== History ==
Mocean Energy was founded in Edinburgh in 2015 by Dr. Cameron McNatt and Dr. Chris Retzler; both of whom have a PhD from the University of Edinburgh. Prior to working at Mocean, Retzler was a founding member and principal scientist at Pelamis Wave Power until that company went into administration in November 2014.

=== Wave Energy Scotland NWEC programme ===
The Mocean concept was initially developed through the Wave Energy Scotland Novel Wave Energy Convertor (NWEC) programme, stages 1 to 3. This was a competitive staged development process with stage-gate assessments, funded through pre-commercial procurement. (Note: "Pre-commercial procurement" concerns the commissioning of research and development delivery in advance of production becoming commercially feasible.)

Mocean was one of eight concepts selected for NWEC Stage 1. They performed numerical modelling and optimisation, tank testing at the FloWave Ocean Energy Research Facility using both 1:50 and 1:20 scale models, plus concept engineering and cost modelling.

In April 2017, Mocean was one of five companies successful in progressing to NWEC Stage 2, with a further £730k in funding.

NWEC Stage 3 saw Mocean test a 28 m long, 38 tonne Blue X device rated at 10 kW in the EMEC Scapa Flow scale test site for five months from June 2021, gaining valuable operational experience. The device operated at sea for 154 days, with steady output around 5 kW and instantaneous peaks of up to 30 kW.

The Blue X was fabricated by AJS Production in Cowdenbeath, before being shipped by road and freight ferry to Aberdeen then Orkney. It was originally planned to test the Blue X at the EMEC Billia Croo grid-connected test site, however this did not happen due to the RSP project.

=== Renewables for subsea power ===
In 2022, Mocean announced they had secured £730k of equity funding to re-use their Blue X prototype in a project aimed at helping decarbonise the oil & gas industry by providing power to autonomous underwater vehicles (AUV) and other subsea infrastructure. Project partner Verlume supplied a Halo battery that powered an AUV from Transmark Subsea. The battery was charged via an umbilical cable by the Mocean Blue X WEC.

The project was initially proposed to be four months, however this was extended, and in March 2024 the project was concluded following a 12-month sea deployment. Mocean released video footage in October 2023 of the device operating during Storm Babet in conditions with 6–7m significant wave height.

The project gained support from several major oil companies, including Baker Hughes, PTTEP, Serica Energy, Harbour Energy, and more recently TotalEnergies and Shell Technology. It was also supported by the Net Zero Technology Centre.

=== EuropeWave ===
Mocean is developing the next generation 250 kW Blue Horizon WEC through the EuropeWave programme, a successor to the Wave Energy Scotland Novel Wave Energy Convertor programme they successfully completed in 2021. The Blue Horizon will produce about 25 times the power of the Blue X, from a device about 2.5 times as long.

In 2022, Mocean announced they would be testing 1:50 and 1:25 scale 3D-printed prototypes of the Blue Horizon in the FloWave test facility as part of EuropeWave Stage 1.

The company was one of five successful in progressing to Stage 2 of the EuropeWave programme in September 2022, to progress the front-end engineering design of the device, ready for real sea testing in Stage 3.

Mocean was awarded €3.7m (£3.2m) in September 2023 to build and test a 250 kW prototype as part of EuropeWave Stage 3. It is planned to test the device at the grid connected EMEC Billia Croo test site in 2025/2026, for a full year at sea.

In November 2023, the company raised £2.2 million in new equity to develop wave energy technology.

In October 2024, Mocean Energy partnered with Proserv to pursue development of renewable power solutions for subsea control systems.

== See also ==
- Wave Energy Scotland
