= European Marine Energy Centre =

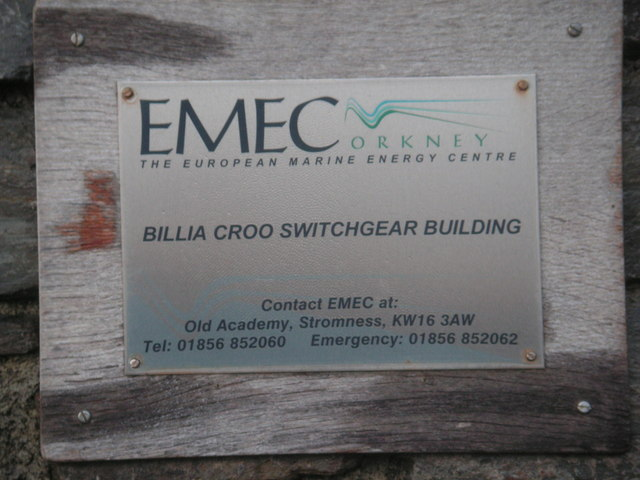

The European Marine Energy Centre (EMEC) Ltd. is the world's leading test and research centre focused on wave and tidal power development, based in the Orkney Islands off the mainland of Scotland. The centre provides developers with the opportunity to test full-scale grid-connected prototype devices in wave and tidal conditions, at pre-consented test sites. EMEC also has sites for testing smaller-scale prototypes, as well as subsystems and components, in more sheltered conditions.

In addition to EMEC's wave and tidal sites, EMEC has an onshore R&D facility in Eday, next to the tidal energy test site, where projects looking at renewables and energy systems integration take place. EMEC has hosted projects exploring green hydrogen, battery storage, e-fuels, refuelling technologies and data centres.

EMEC was established in 2003 by a grouping of public sector organisations following a recommendation by the House of Commons Science and Technology Committee in 2001. In addition to providing access to areas of the sea with high wave and tidal energy potential, the centre also offers various kinds of support regarding regulatory issues, grid connection, and meteorological monitoring, as well as local research and engineering support.

== EMEC Sites ==
The operations are spread over six sites across Orkney:

- Billia Croo wave energy test site, off the west coast of the Orkney Mainland (wave power).
- Fall of Warness tidal energy test site, off the island of Eday (tidal power).
- Caldale renewables integration R&D site, on Eday, next to the Fall of Warness site.
- Scale wave test site at Scapa Flow, off St. Mary's Bay.
- Scale tidal test site at Shapinsay Sound, off the Head of Holland.
- The main office and data facilities are located in Stromness, in The Charles Clouston Building, part of the Orkney Research and Innovation Campus.

== Wave power testing at EMEC, Billia Croo ==
EMEC Billia Croo
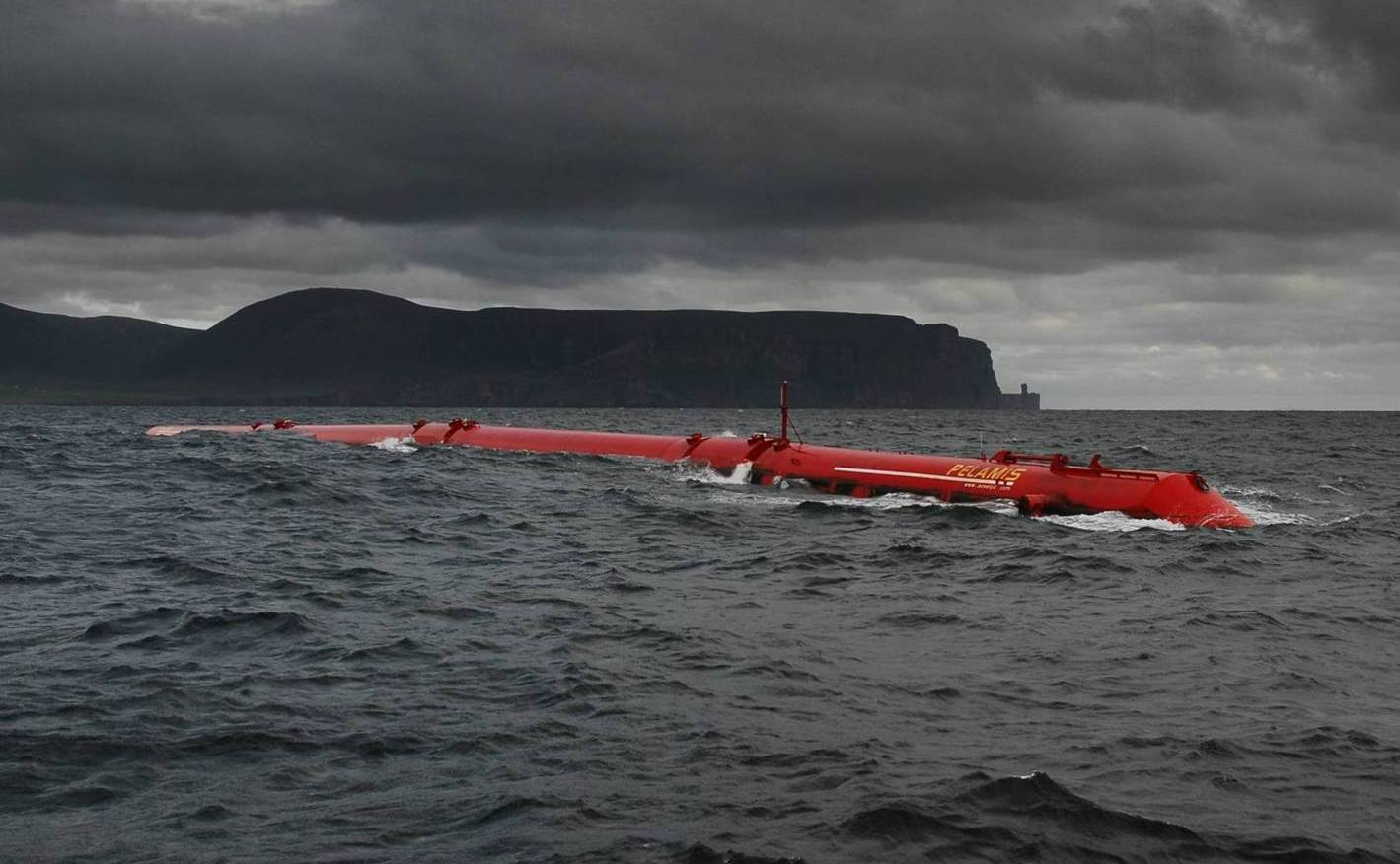
- Pelamis wave energy converter on site at EMEC
- Country: United Kingdom
- Location: Orkney, Scotland
- Coordinates: 58°58′9.48″N 3°21′46.8″W
- Status: Wave energy test site
- Operator: EMEC

Power generation
- Make and model: None at present

External links
- Website: www.emec.org.uk
- Commons: Related media on Commons

EMEC's wave test facility is situated on the western edge of the Orkney mainland, in an area with high wave energy potentials in Europe. The exposed North Sea location means the island group is subjected to the powerful dynamic forces of the North Atlantic Ocean, with the highest wave recorded by EMEC reaching over 18 meters. Construction of the wave test facility was completed in October 2003, and operational activities commenced shortly thereafter. The centre's facilities consist of five cabled test berths, ranging from 50 to 70 m water depth off Billia Croo, Stromness on the Orkney mainland (some 2 km offshore), and two shallow water berths situated close to EMEC's onshore substation.

=== Wave technologies tested ===
The following technologies have been installed and tested at the Billia Croo wave test site:

- Pelamis Wave Power (PWP) installed its prototype Pelamis 750 device on site for full-scale testing in August 2004. This wave energy conversion machine was the first in the world to generate electricity for a grid system from offshore wave energy.
- AW-Energy from Finland undertook stand-alone mechanical testing in 2005 in the shallower waters at the test site.
- Aquamarine Power Ltd. installed its Oyster wave power device on the seabed in August 2009 and generated electricity for the first time in November of the same year.
- Scottish Power and Pelamis Wave Power tested a second-generation Pelamis P2 device in conjunction with a second P2 device previously owned by E.on in 2010, but it was transferred to Pelamis Wave Power in 2013.
- Aquamarine installed its Oyster 2 800 kW wave energy converter in the summer of 2011.
- Wello, a Finnish-based company, first tested its Penguin wave energy converter at the EMEC site throughout 2012/2013. The Penguin was reinstalled at EMEC in March 2017 as part of a Horizon 2020 research and innovation project, however it sank in March 2019.
- Seatricity, an Antigua-based company, tested its technology at EMEC in 2014. The wave converter adopted a similar method to Aquamarine Power by using its device to pump water ashore to a standard hydro-electric power take-off system.

As of March 2026, two wave energy developers are planning to test at the Fall of Warness.

- OceanEnergy plan to test a 1 MW OE buoy as part of the WEDUSEA project.
- CorPower Ocean plan to develop a 5 MW, currently scheduled for deployment in 2029.

== Tidal power testing at EMEC, Fall of Warness ==
EMEC Fall of Warness
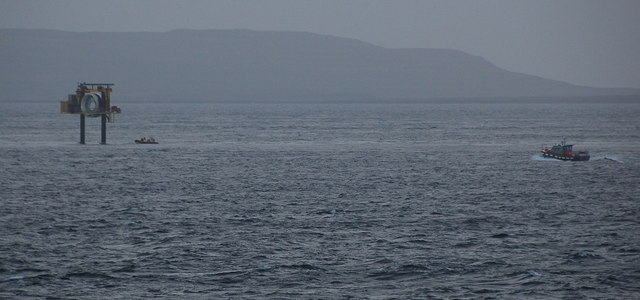
- OpenHydro Open-Centre turbine being tested at the Eday site.
- Country: United Kingdom
- Location: Orkney Islands, Scotland
- Coordinates: 59°9′7.92″N 2°49′2.28″W
- Status: Operational test site

Tidal power station
- Type: Tidal stream generator

Power generation
- Make and model: Orbital O2

External links
- Website: www.emec.org.uk
- Commons: Related media on Commons

The tidal power test site is located in the Fall of Warness, to the west of the island of Eday. It was chosen for its high-velocity marine currents, which reach almost 4 m/s (7.8 knots) at spring tides. The facility offers eight test berths at depths ranging from 25 m to 50 m in an area 2 km across and approximately 4 km in length. The test site was officially opened by Alex Salmond, then Scotland's First Minister, in September 2007.

The site is grid-connected, delivering power to the island of Eday at Caldale. EMEC was granted a license for up to 10 MW of tidal generation in March 2016. In 2025, EMEC submitted a "Section 36" application to increase the capacity of the site to 50 MW.

From each developer berth, the subsea cables follow back along the seabed and then pass under the beach and into an onshore substation. An adjacent laydown area then provides an optional area for developers to use conditioning equipment for converting from the level at which they generate to grid-compliant electricity. The substation building has four separate areas: the HV switchroom, communications room, personnel room, and standby generator room.

To balance the fluctuating tidal power and supply a 670 kW hydrogen electrolyser, a 1.8 MWh vanadium redox battery was installed in 2022. This is located alongside the substation.

=== Tidal technologies tested ===
The following tidal developers have installed and tested technologies at EMEC's Fall of Warness tidal test site

- OpenHydro was the first developer to use the site. Dublin-based OpenHydro began the installation of their open-centred turbine in 2006. OpenHydro became the first tidal technology to be grid-connected in Scotland and, subsequently, the first tidal stream generator to successfully generate electricity for the national grid in the UK. OpenHydro has also placed a blank turbine on the seabed adjoining their installed device, using the specially commissioned "OpenHydro Installer," and in January 2016, they were testing their 7th generation tidal technology at EMEC.
- Scotrenewables (now Orbital Marine Power) deployed the SR250 floating tidal turbine for the first time in 2011. Their 2 MW SR2000 was installed at the site for the first time in 2016. In 12 months of continuous generation into the Orkney grid, the SR2000 exported over 3 GWh of renewable electricity into the grid. The SR2000 was removed from the site in September 2018 to make way for the build and installation of their optimised 2 MW floating tidal turbine, the Orbital O2, which was installed at EMEC in 2021.
- Magallanes Renovables has tested two prototypes at EMEC: a tenth-scale version at the Shapinsay site, and a full-scale 1.5 MW floating tidal turbine at the Fall of Warness between 2019 and 2023.
- Atlantis Resources Corporation installed two tidal turbines: the AK-1000 tidal turbine, which was subsequently replaced by the AR-1000. Following prototype testing at EMEC, the company progressed with the development of the next generation turbine, the AR1500, which is deployed as part of the MeyGen project.
- Alstom (formerly Tidal Generation Ltd): TGL deployed their 500 kW DeepGen tidal turbine at EMEC in 2009 and began generating for the grid the following year. They subsequently replaced the 500 kW device with a 1 MW version of the technology at EMEC.
- ANDRITZ HYDRO Hammerfest installed their 1 MW HS1000 tidal energy converter in 2011. The technology was then further developed into a 1.5 MW device, which has been installed at MeyGen off the coast of Caithness.
- Voith deployed their Hy-Tide 1MW turbine at the Fall of Warness in 2013.
- Sustainable Marine Energy (SME), December 15, brought its PLAT-O 1 MW tidal system, a moored buoyant platform that is positioned mid-water column, to test at EMEC in April 2016.
- Tocardo demonstrated its T2 tidal turbine at EMEC in 2017.

As of December 2023, Orbital Marine Power occupy berths 3,5, 6 and 8, Magallanes Renovables have berth 1, Open Hydro are still listed as occupying berth 4, and EMEC have berth 7.

=== Proposed tidal projects ===
As of February 2026, three technology developers have Contracts for Difference to supply electricity to the UK grid from projects at the Fall of Warness.

- Magallanes Renovables have been awarded two contracts for 4.5 MW in total at EMEC Berth 1.
- Nova Innovation have contracts for 6 MW in total, split between the OCEAN-STAR and SEA-STAR projects, the latter is also supported by Horizon Europe funding.
- Orbital Marine Power, have a total pipeline of 17 MW, partly supported by the Horizon Europe funded EURO-TIDES project.

== Non-grid connected test sites ==
EMEC has also worked to ease the path to market for marine renewable developers by developing test sites in less challenging conditions, helping to close the gap between testing in a wave or tidal tank and bringing full-scale prototypes to trial in real sea conditions. These non-grid-connected test sites, situated at Shapinsay Sound and Scapa Flow, provide a more flexible sea space for use by smaller-scale technologies, supply chain companies, and equipment manufacturers. Such accessible real-sea testing enables marine energy developers and suppliers to learn lessons more cheaply by reducing the need for big vessels or large plants. At these sites, multi-point anchoring systems provide developers with a fully functional alternative to either bringing their own gravity base or having to drill and install anchor chains and mooring blocks. Bespoke test support buoys allow developers to dissipate the electricity generated by their devices in an environmentally conscious way while transferring wave and tidal data back to the control centre. An area of seabed is also available for rehearsal of deployment techniques.

Technologies that have been tested at EMEC's non-grid-connected sites include:

=== Shapinsay Sound Tidal Site ===
- Flumill tested a twin helical-screw turbine from November 2011.
- Nautricity deployed a 500 kW prototype in May 2014.
- Magallanes, tested a 1:10 scale prototype from November 2014.
- East Coast Oil and Gas Engineering (EC-OG) tested a Subsea Power Hub between April and September 2017. The device was designed to convert ocean currents into power for remote subsea locations

=== Scapa Flow Wave Site ===
- CorPower Ocean tested a half-scale 25 kW C3 device from January 2018 to March 2019.
- Mocean Energy tested a 10 kW prototype Blue-X at Scapa Flow from June to November 2021. This device was redeployed as part of the Renewables for Subsea Power project, 5 kilometres east of Orkney, in March 2023.
- AWS Ocean Energy tested a 10 kW prototype Wave Swing in 2022.

== Other Activities ==
=== Performance Assessment ===
EMEC is a recognised test laboratory operation to ISO 17025 standards and can test the performance of wave and tidal energy devices against IEC Technical Specifications. Technical Verification EMEC can provide independent verification in accordance with ISO 17020 to confirm that a wave energy converter satisfies its conceptual reliability, survivability, and performance targets. Marine industry standards EMEC has coordinated the development of a suite of standards on behalf of the marine renewable energy industry. Each document has been progressed by a working group with individuals representing technology developers, regulators, academia, utilities, and project developers. These standards were launched in 2009. In March 2014, EMEC, in collaboration with the Offshore Renewable Energy Catapult (ORE Catapult), facilitated a workshop to review the existing suite of EMEC standards and identify areas where new standards needed to be developed.

=== Research and monitoring ===
For most developers coming to deploy at EMEC, installation at these facilities will be the first time their device has been in the open sea and grid connected. They typically will not have a track record which indicates the type and extent of interactions between the device and the receiving environment. Therefore, whilst the central purpose of EMEC is to provide an operational test facility, there is also a key role in establishing and facilitating monitoring of devices in relation to their impacts on the receiving environment. The main driver to this has been through the consenting process, which requires developers to consider environmental issues prior to testing at EMEC and to mitigate against any potential for negative impact.

The involvement within the research field has led EMEC to occupy a unique position, having links with a range of different developers and devices, as well as academic institutions and regulatory bodies. EMEC is independent of any developer or device, as EMEC aims to ensure that different devices are monitored in a consistent way, using the best available methods. Independence of EMEC also encourages the dissemination of monitoring information can be carried out throughout the industry.

A 450 kW submerged Microsoft data center was tested at EMEC's wave test site in 2018. The project was part of Microsoft's ongoing quest for cloud data center solutions that are less resource intensive and offer rapid provisioning, lower costs, and high agility to meet the needs of cloud users around the world. Deepwater deployment offers ready access to cooling, a controlled environment, and has the potential to be powered by co-located renewable power sources.

=== Power Purchase Agreement ===
SmartestEnergy has signed a Power Purchase Agreement with the EMEC, for the power generated from their wave and tidal devices in the Orkney Islands.

=== Green hydrogen ===
In 2016, EMEC installed a 0.5 MW rapid response PEM (Proton Exchange Membrane) electrolyser in the laydown area adjacent to the substation to produce ‘green’ hydrogen from excess renewable energy produced by tidal energy converters testing at the Fall of Warness and from the 900 kW Eday community wind turbine.

In 2017 EMEC achieved the world's first tidal generated hydrogen using power from tidal energy clients, Orbital and Tocardo, which were testing tidal energy devices on site.

This is part of a demonstration project to consider whether producing hydrogen and using it as an energy storage medium is a solution to overcome local grid constraints, enabling large scale renewable integration.

=== Energy systems ===
EMEC is also involved in wider energy systems demonstration projects. EMEC led a £28.5m project called ReFLEX Orkney looking to decarbonise the wider energy system. The ReFLEX project, short for "responsive flexibility", ran from April 2019 to March 2023. It aimed to integrate electricity, transport and heat systems in Orkney using clever software coupled with an increase of flexible demand assets like batteries and electric vehicles. This will help Orkney maximize the potential of its renewable energy resource, provide more affordable energy services, and lower the county's carbon footprint by decreasing reliance on imported carbon-intensive grid electricity from the UK mainland.

== See also ==
- E.ON
- Renewable energy in Scotland
