= Renewable energy in Scotland =

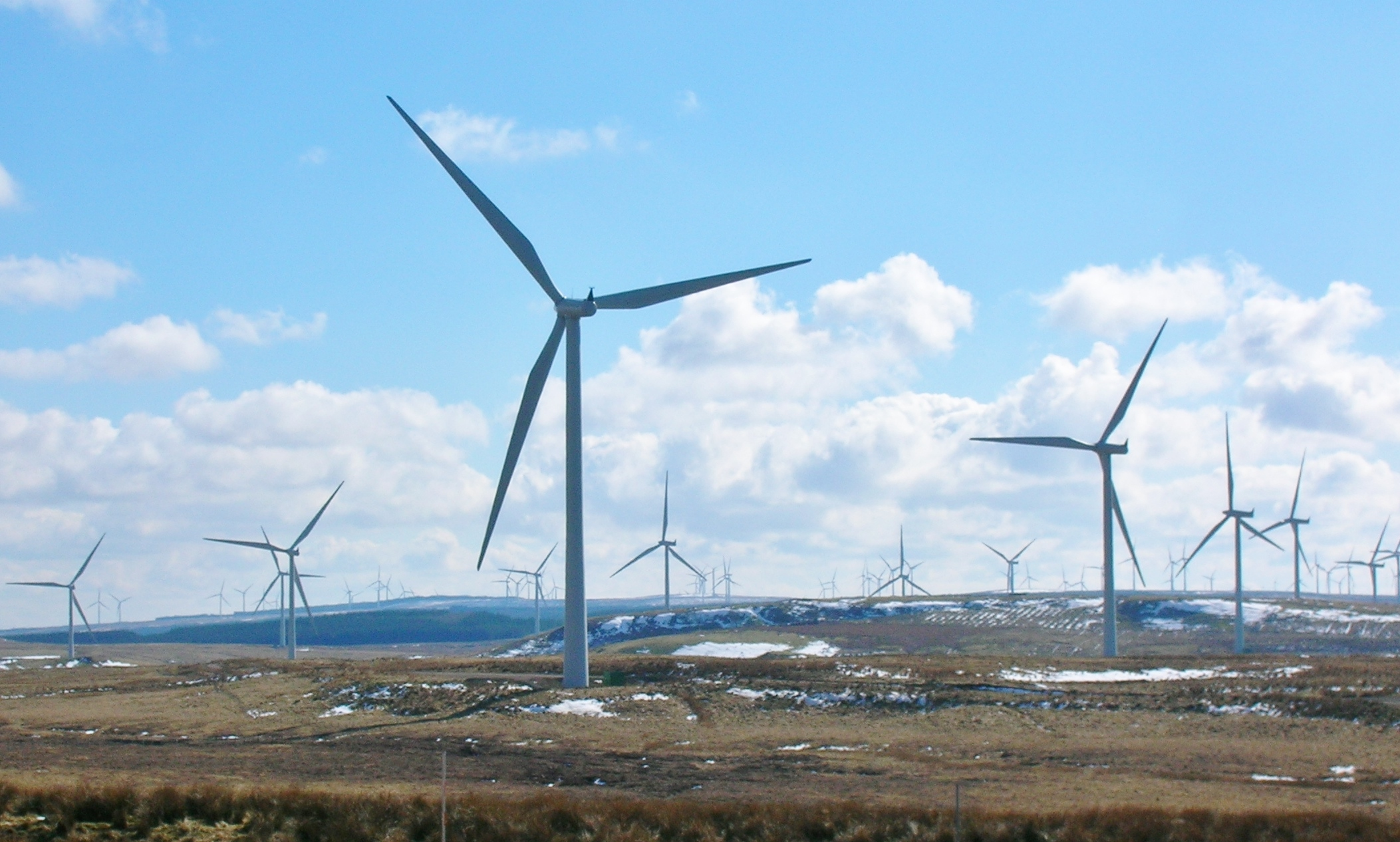
Whitelee Wind Farm is operated by Scottish Power Renewables and is the largest on-shore wind farm in the United Kingdom with a total capacity of 539 megawatts (MW).

The production of renewable energy in Scotland is a topic that came to the fore in technical, economic, and political terms during the opening years of the 21st century. The natural resource base for renewable energy is high by European, and even global standards, with the most important potential sources being wind, wave, and tide. Renewables generate almost all of Scotland's electricity, mostly from the country's wind power.

In 2020, Scotland had 12 gigawatts (GW) of renewable electricity capacity, which produced about a quarter of total UK renewable generation. In decreasing order of capacity, Scotland's renewable generation comes from onshore wind, hydropower, offshore wind, solar PV and biomass. Scotland exports much of this electricity. On 26 January 2024, the Scottish Government confirmed that Scotland generated the equivalent of 113% of Scotland's electricity consumption from renewable energy sources, making it the highest percentage figure ever recorded for renewable energy production in Scotland. It was hailed as "a significant milestone in Scotland's journey to net zero" by the Cabinet Secretary for Wellbeing Economy, Fair Work and Energy, Neil Gray. It becomes the first time that Scotland produced more renewable energy than it actually consumed, and demonstrates the "enormous potential of Scotland's green economy" as claimed by Gray.

Continuing improvements in engineering and economics are enabling more of the renewable resources to be used. Fears regarding fuel poverty and climate change have driven the subject high up the political agenda. In 2020 a quarter of total energy consumption, including heat and transportation, was met from renewables, and the Scottish government target is half by 2030. Although the finances of some projects remain speculative or dependent on market incentives, there has been a significant—and, in all likelihood, long-term—change in the underpinning economics.

In addition to planned increases in large-scale generating capacity using renewable sources, various related schemes to reduce carbon emissions are being researched. Although there is significant support from the public, private and community-led sectors, concerns about the effect of the technologies on the natural environment have been expressed. There is also a political debate about the relationship between the siting, and the ownership and control of these widely distributed resources.

== Realisation of the potential ==
=== Summary of Scotland's resource potential ===
Technology	Current capacity (GW) (Note: Table sources: Total capacity from all sources in 2006 was estimated at 10.3 and 9.8 GW. Renewable electricity capacity in Scotland has risen from 15.1 GW in September 2023 to 16 GW in September 2024. In the third quarter of 2024, Scotland experienced an increase of 8.5% in the electricity generated from renewable sources in comparison to the third quarter of 2023. In 2006 total energy demand was 177.8 TWh. In contrast, final electricity consumption in Scotland has fallen over the past few years, with 21.8 TWh consumed in 2023. Electricity makes up 20% of total energy use, but about 15 TWh are exported or lost in transmission. The tidal potential of the Pentland Firth alone is estimated elsewhere at over 10 GW. Geothermal potential capacity is estimated from potential output. Micro generation (including solar) is estimated as having the potential of producing up to 40% of current electrical demand by 2050, i.e. circa 14 TWh. As of March 2024, more than one in four households in Orkney and the Western Isles have a renewable energy installation certified by the MCS.)	Potential capacity (GW) (Note: Note on "installed capacity" and "potential energy". The former is an estimate of the maximum productive output of a given technology or individual generation station at a single point in time. The latter takes into account the likely intermittency of energy supply and is a measure of output over a period of time. Thus, for example, individual wind turbines may have a capacity factor of between 15% and 45% depending on their location, with a higher capacity factor giving a greater potential energy output for a given installed capacity. The potential energy column is thus an estimate based on a variety of assumptions including the installed capacity. Although potential energy is in some ways a more useful method of comparing the current output and future potential of different technologies, using it would require cumbersome explanations of all the assumptions involved in each example, so installed capacity figures are generally used.)	Potential energy (TWh) (Note: A gigawatt (GW) is a measure of productive capacity. Terawatt-hours (TWh) measure actual output. Thus, an 8 GW power station operating ten hours per day will produce 8x10 equals 80 TWh of electricity. Whenever possible this article refers to predictions of maximum output in GW.)
Onshore wind	8.991	11.5	45.0
Hydro	1.667	n.a.	5.52
Offshore wind	2.166	25	82.0
Biomass	0.272	0.45	13.5
Solar PV	0.505	6	n.a.
Landfill Gas	0.116	n.a	0.6
Anaerobic Digestion	0.060	n.a	n.a
Energy from Waste	0.070	n.a	0.6
Wave and Tidal	0.022	25	79
Sewage Sludge Digestion	0.008	n.a	n.a
Geothermal	n.a.	12	7.6
Solar thermal	n.a.	n.a.	5.8
Total	13.877 GW	about 70 GW	236.6 TWh/year

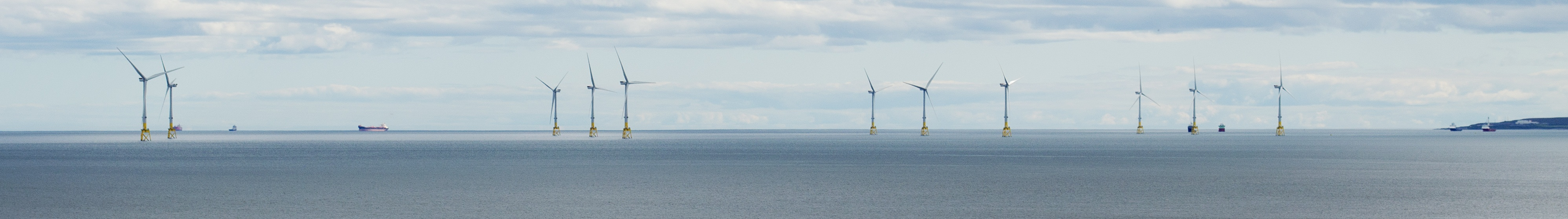
All eleven turbines of the European Offshore Wind Deployment Centre off the coast of Aberdeen. Wind, wave, and tide make up more than 80% of Scotland's renewable energy potential.

=== Targets ===
In 2005 the aim was for 18% of Scotland's electricity production to be generated by renewable sources by 2010, rising to 40% by 2020. In 2007 this was increased to 50% of electricity from renewables by 2020, with an interim target of 31% by 2011. The following year new targets to reduce overall greenhouse gas emissions by 80% by 2050 were announced and then confirmed in the 2009 Climate Change Delivery Plan. Maf Smith, director of the Sustainable Development Commission in Scotland said "Governments across the world are shying away from taking the necessary action. The Scottish Government must be commended for its intention to lead the way".

Scotland aims to produce 50% of all energy (not just electricity) from renewable sources by 2030.

In January 2026, the target for offshore wind in Scotland was increased to 40 GW by 2040, up from the previous ambition of 8–11 GW by 2030. This was announced by the Cabinet Secretary for Climate Action and Energy, Gillian Martin at the Scottish Renewables Offshore Wind Conference in Glasgow.

It remains a policy of the Scottish Government to reduce emissions to net zero by 2045.

=== History ===
Electricity production is only part of the overall energy use budget. In 2002, Scotland consumed a total of 175 terawatt-hours (TWh) of energy in all forms, some 2% less than in 1990. Of this, only 20% was consumed in the form of electricity by end users, the great majority of energy utilised is from the burning of oil (41%) and gas (36%). Nonetheless, the renewable electricity generating capacity may be 60 GW or more, greater than required to provide the existing energy provided from all Scottish fuel sources of 157 TWh.

2002 figures used as a baseline in RSPB Scotland et al. (2006) for electricity production are: gas (34%), oil (28%), coal (18%) and nuclear (17%), with renewables 3% (principally hydro-electric), prior to the substantial growth in wind power output. In January 2006 the total installed electrical generating capacity from all forms of renewable energy was less than 2 GW, about a fifth of the total electrical production. Scotland also has significant quantities of fossil fuel deposits, including substantial proven reserves of oil and gas and 69% of UK coal reserves. Nonetheless, the Scottish Government has set ambitious targets for renewable energy production.

Most electricity in Scotland is carried through the National Grid, with Scotland's renewable mix thus contributing to the electricity production of Great Britain as a whole. By 2012, over 40% of Scotland's electricity came from renewable energy, and Scotland contributed almost 40% of the UK's renewables output. At the end of that year there was 5,801 megawatts (MW) of installed renewables electricity capacity, an increase of 20.95% (1,005 MW) on the end of 2011. Renewable electricity generation in 2012 was a record high at 14,756 GWh – an increase of 7.3% on 2011, the previous record year for renewables output. In 2015, Scotland generated 59% of its electricity consumption through renewable sources, exceeding the country's goal of 50% renewable electricity by that year.

In 2018, Scotland exported over 28% of electricity generation to the rest of the UK. By 2019 renewable electricity generation was 30,528 GWh, over 90% of Scotland's gross electricity consumption (33,914 GWh) and 21% of overall energy use was produced from renewable sources, against Scottish Government targets of 100% by 2020 and 50% by 2030 respectively. At the start of 2020, Scotland had 11.8 gigawatts (GW) of installed renewable electricity capacity which produced approximately 25% of total UK renewable generation (119,335 GWh).

=== Economic impact ===
The renewable energy industry supports more than 11,500 jobs in Scotland, according to a 2013 study by Scottish Renewables. With 13.9 GW of renewable energy projects in the pipeline, the sector has the potential to grow quickly in the years ahead creating more jobs in the region. Glasgow, Fife and Edinburgh are key centres of offshore wind power development, and the emerging wave power and tidal power industries are centred around the Highlands and Islands. Rural job creation is being supported by bioenergy systems in areas such as Lochaber, Moray and Dumfries and Galloway. Although the finances of some projects remain speculative or dependent on market incentives there has been a significant and in all likelihood long-term change, in the underpinning economics.

An important reason for this ambition is growing international concern about human-induced climate change. The Royal Commission on Environmental Pollution's proposal that carbon dioxide emissions should be reduced by 60% was incorporated into the UK government's 2003 Energy White Paper. The 2006 Stern Review proposed a 55% reduction by 2030. Recent Intergovernmental Panel on Climate Change reports have further increased the profile of the issue.

== Hydroelectricity ==
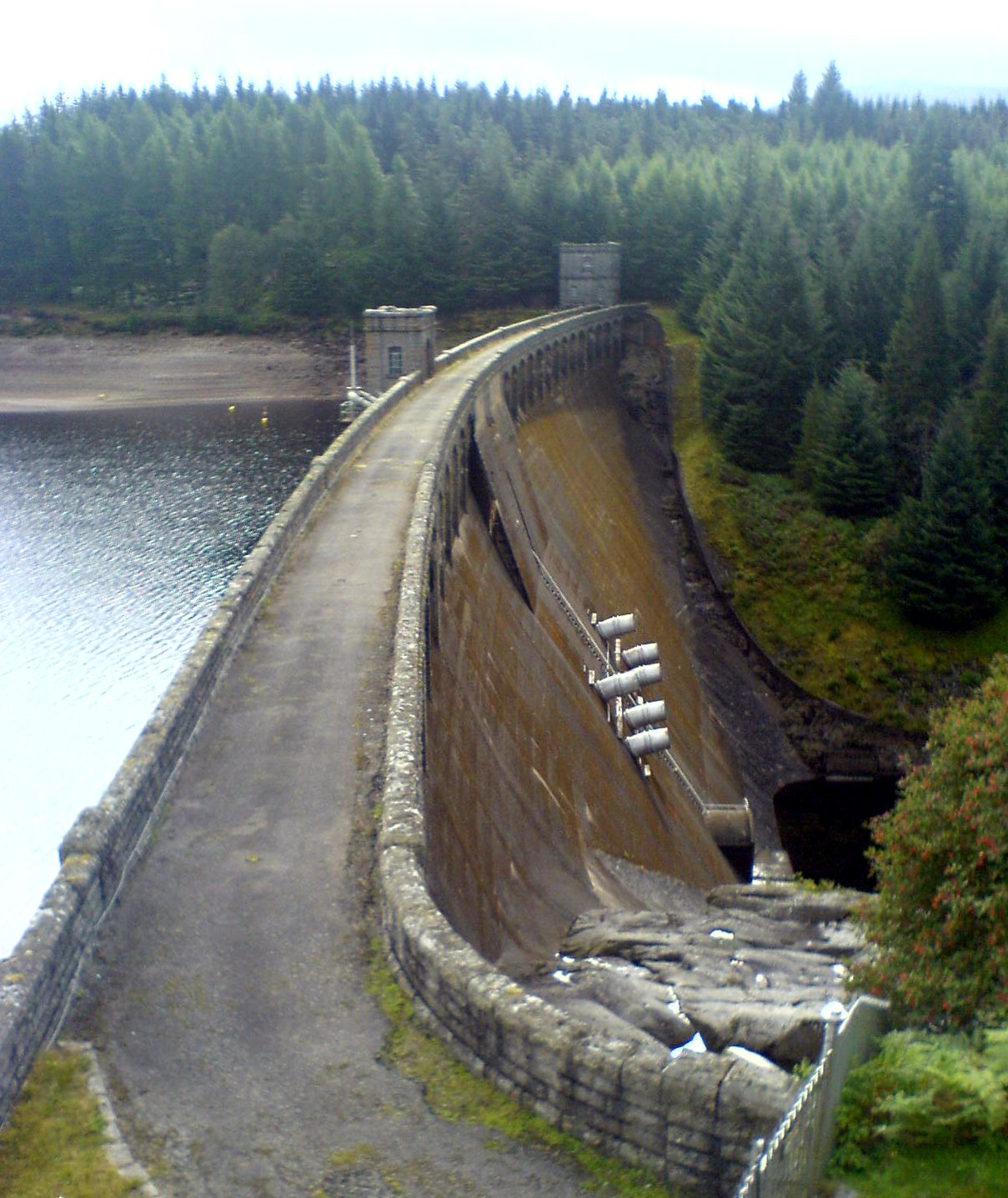
A typical Highland hydro-electric dam at Loch Laggan

As of 2007, Scotland has 85% of the UK's hydroelectricity resource, much of it developed by the North of Scotland Hydro-Electric Board in the 1950s. The "Hydro Board", which brought "power from the glens", was then a nationalised industry, it was privatised in 1989 and is now part of Scottish and Southern Energy plc.

As of 2021, installed capacity is 1.67 GW, this is 88% of total UK capacity and includes major developments such as the 120 MW Breadalbane Scheme and the 245 MW Tummel system. Several of Scotland's hydro-electric plants were built to power the aluminium smelting industry. These were built in several "schemes" of linked stations, each covering a catchment area, whereby the same water may generate power several times as it descends. Numerous remote straths were flooded by these schemes, many of the largest of which involved tunnelling through mountains as well as damming rivers. Emma Wood, the author of a study of these pioneers, described the men who risked their lives in these ventures as "tunnel tigers".

As of 2010, it is estimated that as much as another 1.2 GW of capacity remains available to exploit, mostly in the form of micro and small-hydro developments such as those in Knoydart and Kingussie. The 100 MW Glendoe Project, which opened in 2009, was the first large-scale dam for almost fifty years.

In April 2010 permission was granted for four new hydro schemes totalling 6.7 MW capacity in the Loch Lomond and The Trossachs National Park.

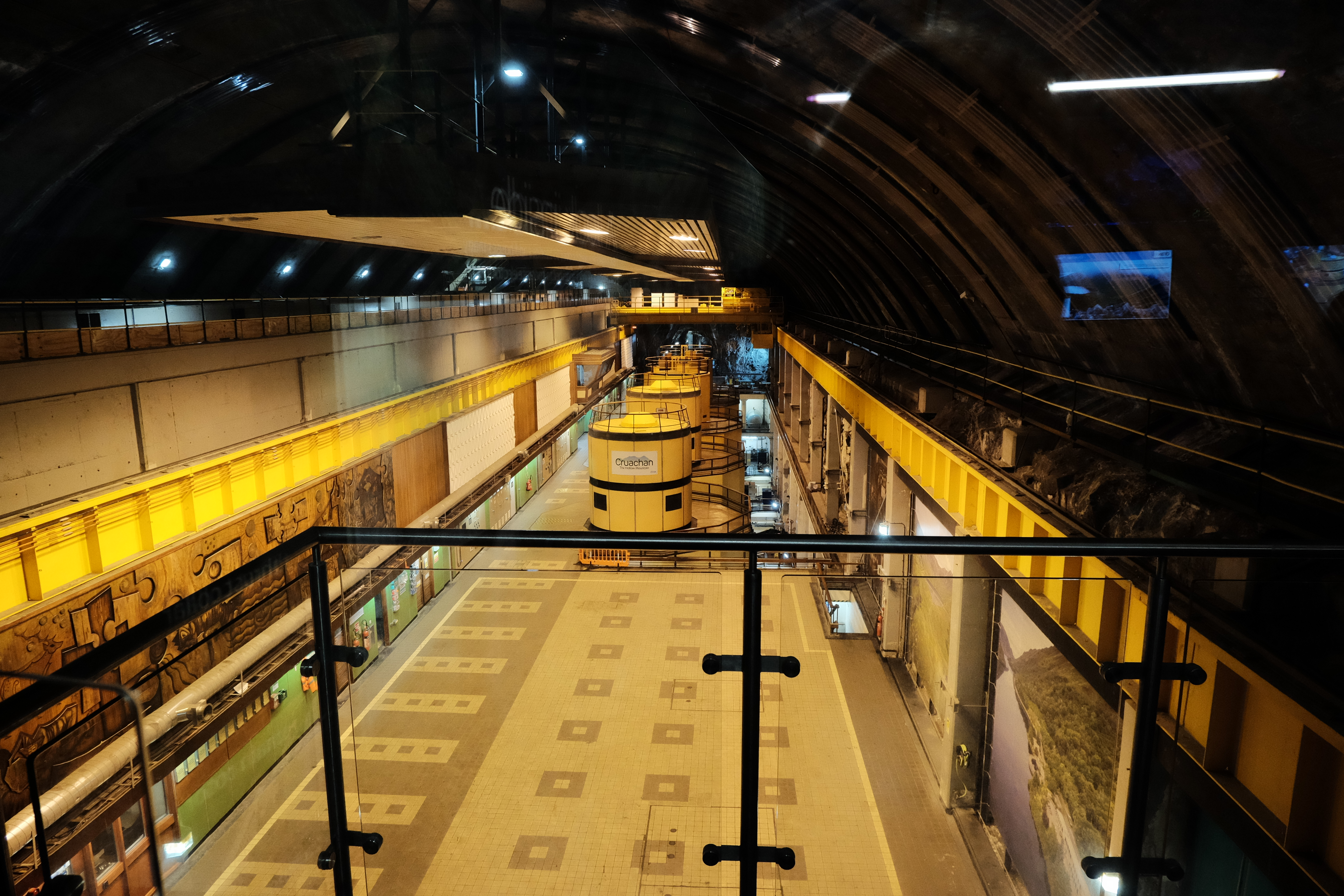
Turbine Hall at Ben Cruachan Hydroelectric scheme in 2024

There is also further potential for new pumped storage schemes that would work with intermittent sources of power such as wind and wave. Operational examples include the 440 MW Cruachan Dam and 300 MW Foyers schemes, while exploratory work for the 1.5 GW Coire Glas scheme commenced in early 2023. These schemes have the primary purpose of balancing peak demands on the electricity grid. (Note: The limited capacity and high cost of pumped storage systems makes it impractical to use them as buffers against periods of low output from other sources; a 2011 report calculated that the total operational pumped storage capacity across Great Britain at the time (and so including the Dinorwig and Ffestiniog schemes in Wales) would only be able to supply approximately 2.8 GW of electricity for a maximum of five hours, then no more than 1 GW for a further 17 hours maximum.)

== Wind power ==
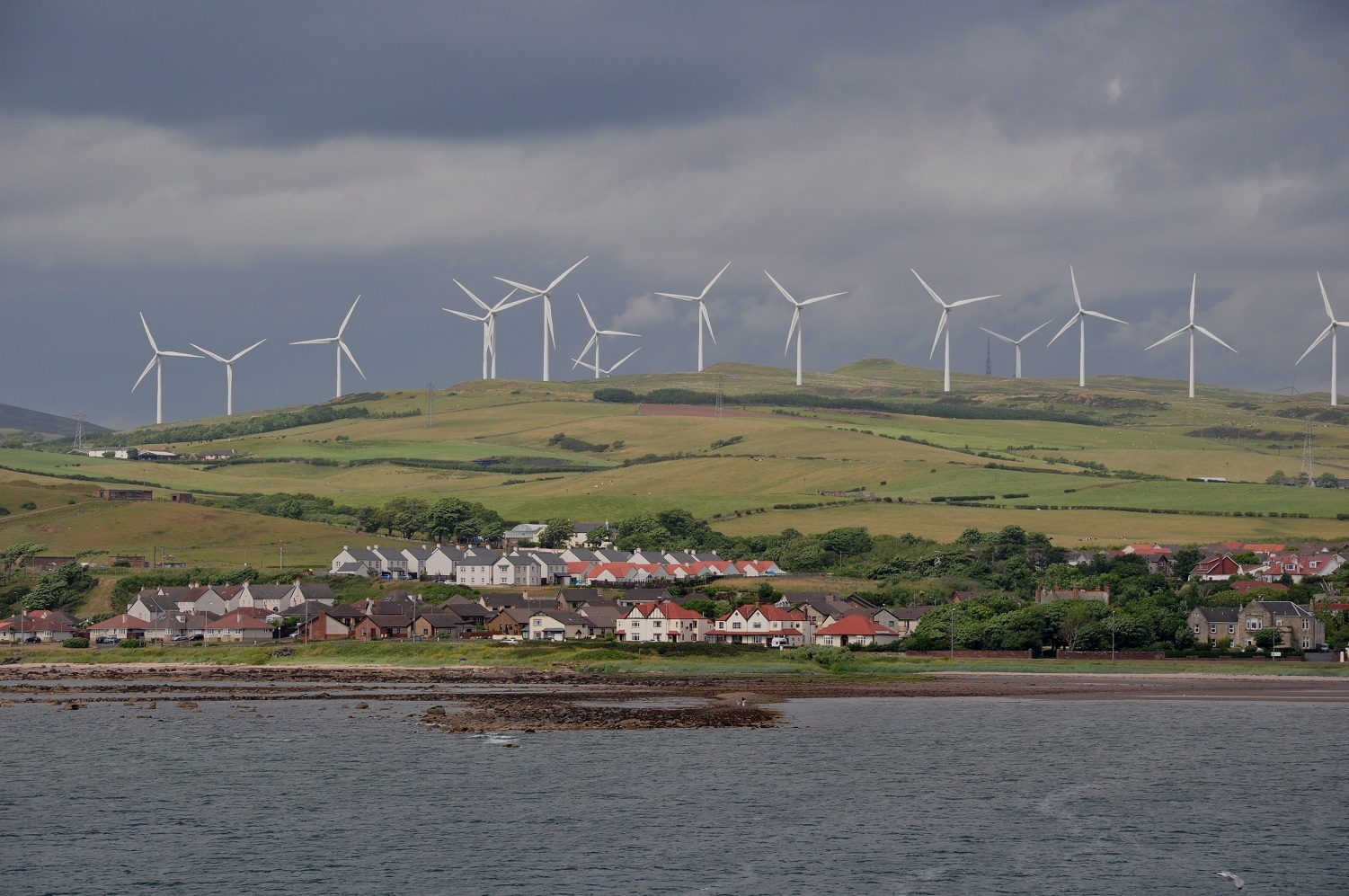
Ardrossan Wind Farm

Wind power is the country's fastest growing renewable energy technology, with 8,423 MW of installed capacity as of 2018. On 7 August 2016, a combination of high wind and low consumption caused more wind power generation (106%) than consumption. Scottish wind turbines provided 39,545 MWh during the 24 hours of that date, while consumption was 37,202 MWh. It was the first time that measurements were available to confirm that fact. Electricity generated by wind in November 2018 was enough to power nearly 6 million homes and wind production outstripped total electricity demand on twenty days during that month. This latter outcome was described by environmental group WWF Scotland as "truly momentous".

The target for 2030, made in 2023, was for 11GW of offshore wind by 2030. This would represent an increase of 400% in offshore wind and a 60% increase in total wind generated power. A later increased target of 40 GW by 2040 was announced in January 2026.

=== Onshore ===
The 54-turbine Black Law Wind Farm has a total capacity of 124 MW. It is located near Forth in South Lanarkshire and was built on an old opencast coalmine site, with an original capacity of 97 MW from 42 turbines. It employs seven permanent staff on site and created 200 jobs during construction. A second phase saw the installation of a further 12 turbines. The project has received wide recognition for its contribution to environmental objectives. The United Kingdom's largest onshore wind farm (539 MW) is at Whitelee in East Renfrewshire.

There are many other onshore wind farms, including some—such as that on the Isle of Gigha—which are in community ownership. The Heritage Trust set up Gigha Renewable Energy to buy and operate three Vestas V27 wind turbines. They were commissioned on 21 January 2005 and are capable of generating up to 675 kW of power and profits are reinvested in the community. The island of Eigg in the Inner Hebrides is not connected to the National Grid, and has an integrated renewable power supply with wind, hydro and solar and battery storage, and a rarely used diesel backup.

The siting of turbines is sometimes an issue, but surveys have generally shown high levels of community acceptance for wind power. Wind farm developers are encouraged to offer "community benefit funds" to help address any disadvantages faced by those living adjacent to wind farms. Nonetheless, Dumfries and Galloway's local development plan guidance concludes that "some areas are considered to have reached capacity for development, due to the significant cumulative effects already evident".

=== Offshore ===
The Robin Rigg Wind Farm is a 180 MW development completed in April 2010, which is Scotland's first offshore wind farm, sited on a sandbank in the Solway Firth. Eleven of the world's most powerful wind turbines (Vestas V164 – 8.4 MW each) are located in the European Offshore Wind Deployment Centre off the east coast of Aberdeenshire.

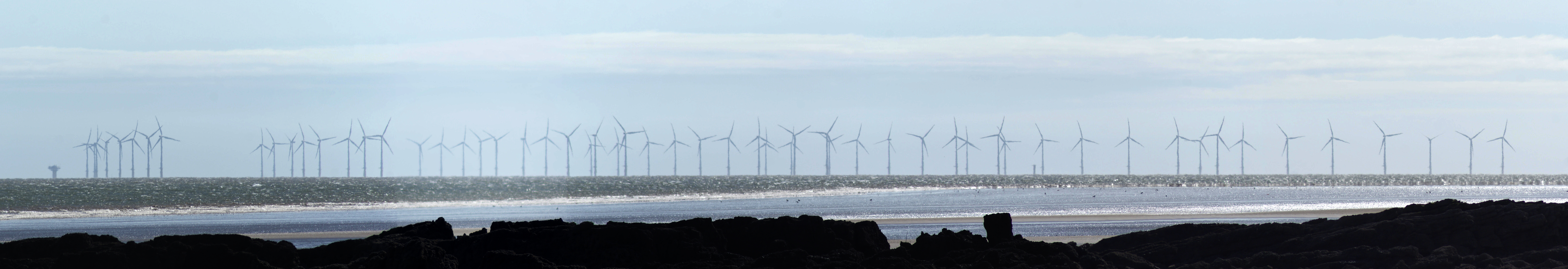
Robin Rigg Wind Farm

It is estimated that 11.5 GW of onshore wind potential exists, enough to provide 45 TWh of energy. More than double this amount exists on offshore sites where mean wind speeds are greater than on land. The total offshore potential is estimated at 25 GW, which although more expensive to install, could be enough to provide almost half the total energy used. Plans to harness up to 4.8 GW of the potential in the inner Moray Firth and Firth of Forth were announced in January 2010. Moray Offshore Renewables and SeaGreen Wind Energy were awarded development contracts by the Crown Estate as part of a UK-wide initiative. Also in 2010, discussions were held between the Scottish Government and Statoil of Norway with a view to developing a 5-turbine floating windfarm, possibly to be located off Fraserburgh. In July 2016, RSPB challenged development in the Firth of Forth and Firth of Tay.

Moray East Offshore Wind Farm was granted consent for a 1,116 MW development in 2014 by the Scottish Government. The 103rd and final jacket for the project was installed in December 2020. The Hywind Scotland array off the coast of Peterhead is the world's first floating wind farm. It consists of five 6 MW turbines which have a rotor diameter of 154m and is aimed at demonstrating the feasibility of larger systems of this type.

== Wave power ==
Various systems have been developed since the 1970s, aimed at harnessing the enormous potential available for wave power off Scotland's coasts. Early development of wave power was led by Stephen Salter at the University of Edinburgh, on the Edinburgh or Salter's duck, although this was never commercialised.

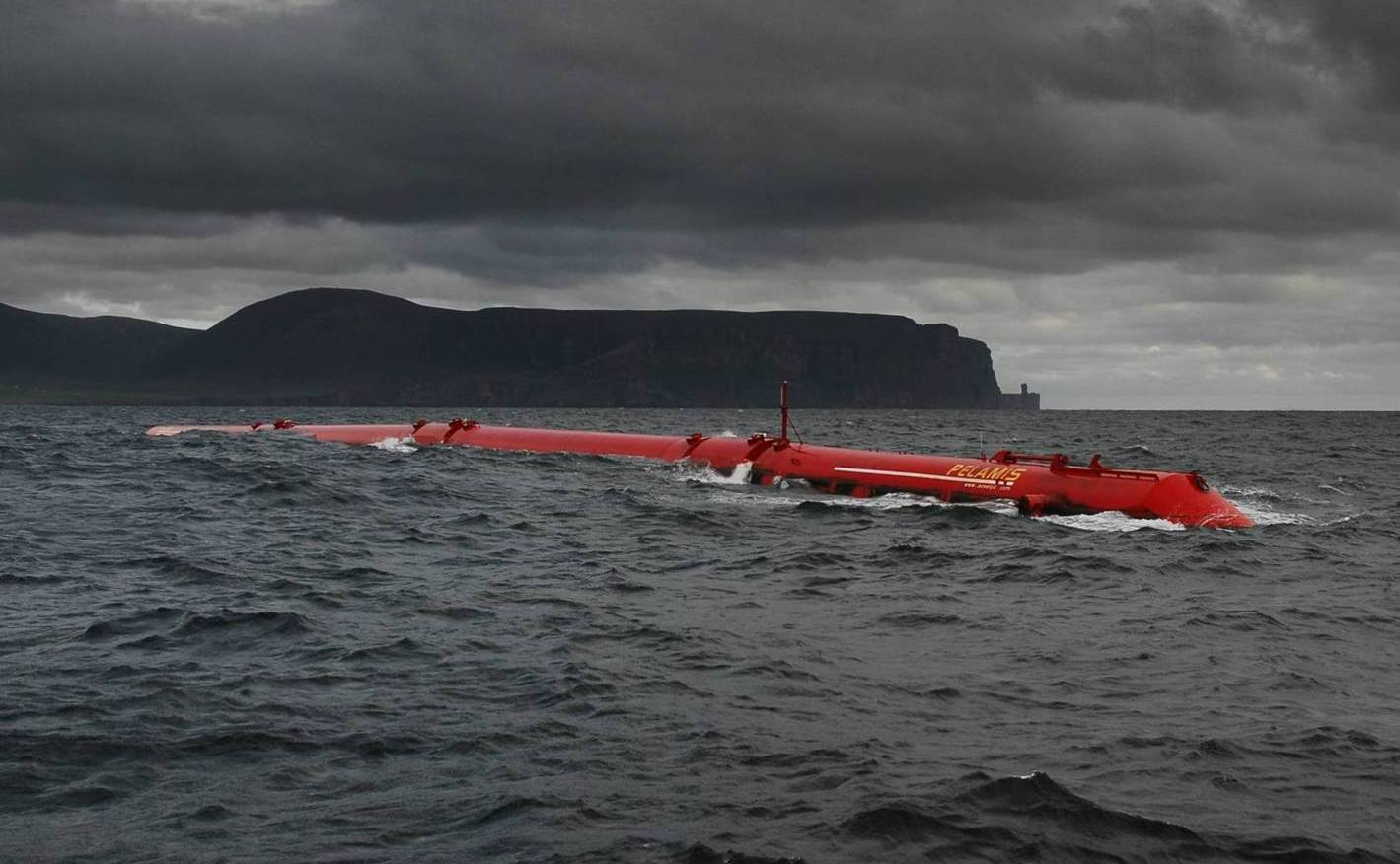
Pelamis on site at EMEC, the marine test centre

One of the first grid-connected wave power stations was the Islay LIMPET (Land Installed Marine Power Energy Transformer) energy converter. It was installed on the island of Islay by Wavegen Ltd, and opened in 2001 as the world's first commercial-scale wave-energy device. However, in March 2013, the new owners Voith Hydro decided to close down Wavegen choosing to concentrate on tidal power projects. The Siadar Wave Energy Project was announced in 2009. This 4 MW system was planned by npower Renewables and Wavegen for a site 400 metres off the shore of Siadar Bay, in Lewis. However, in July 2011 holding company RWE announced it was withdrawing from the scheme, and Wavegen was seeking new partners.

Edinburgh based Ocean Power Delivery, later Pelamis Wave Power, developed the Pelamis Wave Energy Converter between 1998 and 2014. Both the P1 and P2 devices were tested at the European Marine Energy Centre in Orkney, and three P1 machines were installed in Portugal at the Aguçadoura Wave Farm in late 2008. In 2009, the Swedish power firm Vattenfall started development of the Aegir Wave Farm off the west coast of Shetland which would use Pelamis devices, however the project was cancelled after Pelamis went into administration.

Following the demise of Pelamis and Aquamarine Power, Wave Energy Scotland was set up in 2014 to facilitate the development of wave energy. It was set up by the Scottish Government as a subsidiary of Highlands and Islands Enterprise. However, although Scotland has "more wave and tidal devices deployed in our waters than anywhere else in the world" commercial production from wave energy has been slow to develop. Between 2015 and 2022, the Wave Energy Scotland programmes helped fund the development and demonstration of parrt-scale devices by Mocean Energy and AWS Ocean Energy, which were then tested at EMEC. The Mocean device was redeployed within their Renewables for Subsea Power project, providing power for over a year to autonomous monitoring for oil and gas projects.

== Tidal power ==
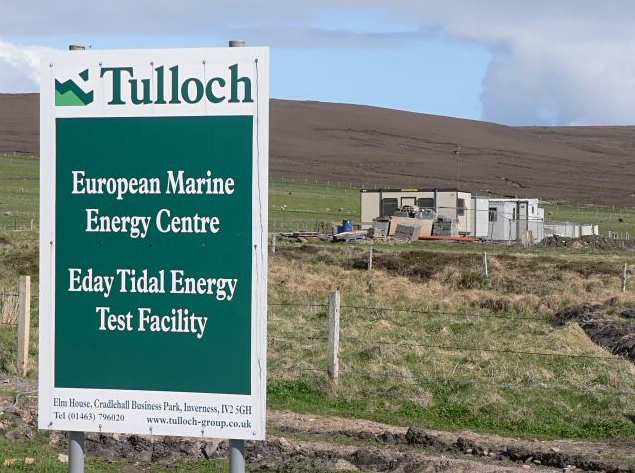
European Marine Energy Centre Tidal power test site on Eday under construction in 2006

Unlike wind and wave, tidal power is an inherently predictable source, and there are many sites around Scotland where it could be harvested to generate power. The Pentland Firth between Orkney and mainland Scotland has been described as the "Saudi Arabia of tidal power" and may be capable of generating up to 10 GW, although a more recent estimate suggests an upper limit of 1.9 GW. In March 2010 a total of ten sites in the area, capable of providing an installed capacity of 1.2 GW of tidal and wave generation were leased out by the Crown Estate. Several other tidal sites with considerable potential exist in the Orkney archipelago. Tidal races on the west coast at Kylerhea between Skye and Lochalsh, the Grey Dog north of Scarba, the Dorus Mòr off Crinan and the Gulf of Corryvreckan also offer significant prospects.

The "world's first community-owned tidal power generator" became operational in Bluemull Sound off Yell, Shetland, in early 2014. This 30 kW Nova Innovation device fed into the local grid, and was replaced by a 100 kW tidal turbine connected in August 2016. The array was expanded to six turbines in January 2023, although the three oldest turbines were removed a few months later.

At the opposite end of the country a 2010 consultants' report into the possibility of a scheme involving the construction of a Solway Barrage, possibly south of Annan, concluded that the plans "would be expensive and environmentally sensitive." In 2013 an alternative scheme using the VerdErg Renewable Energy spectral marine energy converter was proposed for a plan involving the use of a bridge along the route of an abandoned railway line between Annan and Bowness-on-Solway.

In October 2010 MeyGen, a consortium of Morgan Stanley, Atlantis Resources Corporation and International Power, received a 25-year operational lease from the Crown Estate for a 400 MW tidal power project in the Pentland Firth. In September 2013 the Scottish Government granted permission to Meygen for the commencement of the "largest tidal energy project in Europe" and the developer announced the installation of a 9 MW demonstration project of up to six turbines, expanding to an 86 MW array tidal array. Commercial production commenced in November 2016, with the four turbines of Phase 1 installed by February 2017. Current owners SIMEC Atlantis Energy (SAE) intend to develop the MeyGen site up to its current grid capacity of 252 MW. In 2022 and 2023 SAE was awarded Contracts for Difference to supply 28 MW and 22 MW of electricity, which will fund the next stage of the project's development.

Scottish tidal developers Nova Innovation and Orbital Marine Power were each awarded €20m of Horizon Europe funding in 2023 towards developing tidal arrays in Scotland. Nova plan to install 16 turbines totalling 4 MW in Orkney, while Orbital plan four O2 turbines with a total capacity of 9.6 MW.

== Bioenergy ==
=== Biofuel ===
Various small-scale biofuel experiments have been undertaken. For example, in 2021 British Airways flew a 35% aviation biofuel demonstration flight from London to Glasgow. Some say that sustainable aviation fuel (not necessarily biofuel) for the UK should be produced in Scotland due to the high share of renewable energy. Due to the relatively short growing season for sugar producing crops, ethanol is not commercially produced as a fuel.

=== Biogas, anaerobic digestion and landfill gas ===
Biogas, or landfill gas, is a biofuel produced through the intermediary stage of anaerobic digestion consisting mainly of 45–90% biologically produced methane and carbon dioxide. In 2007 a thermophilic anaerobic digestion facility was commissioned in Stornoway in the Western Isles. The Scottish Environment Protection Agency (SEPA) has established a digestate standard to facilitate the use of solid outputs from digesters on land.

It has been recognised that biogas (mainly methane) – produced from the anaerobic digestion of organic matter – is potentially a valuable and prolific feedstock. As of 2006, it is estimated that 0.4 GW of generating capacity might be available from agricultural waste. Landfill sites have the potential for a further 0.07 GW with sites such as the Avondale Landfill in Falkirk already utilising their potential.

=== Solid biomass ===
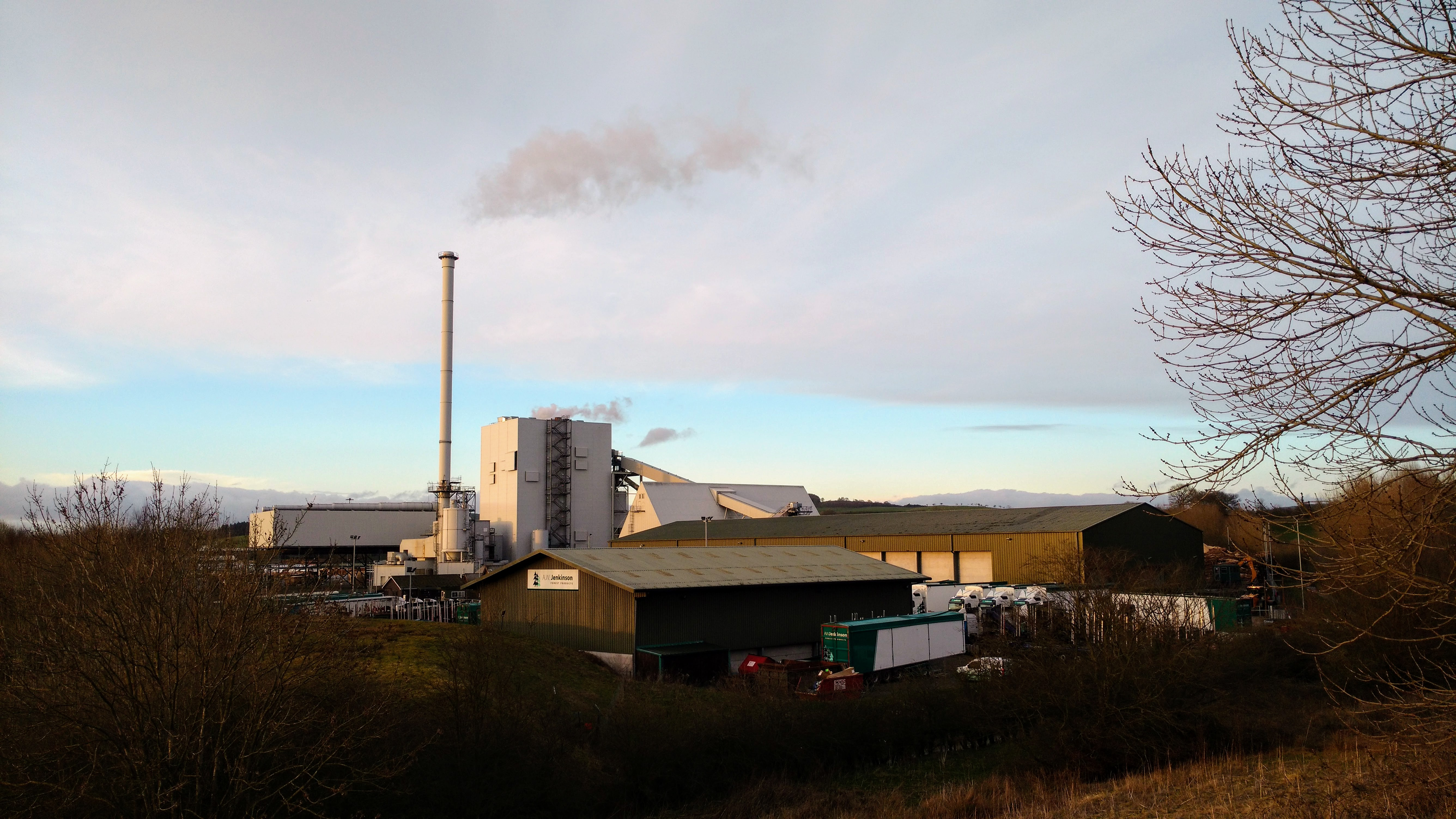
Steven's Croft wood-fired power station near Lockerbie

A 2007 report concluded that wood fuel exceeded hydro-electric and wind as the largest potential source of renewable energy. Scotland's forests, which made up 60% of the UK resource base, were forecast to be able to provide up to 1 million tonnes of wood fuel per annum. The biomass energy supply was forecast to reach 450 MW or higher, (predominantly from wood), with power stations requiring 4,500–5,000 oven-dry tonnes per annum per megawatt of generating capacity. However a 2011 Forestry Commission and Scottish government follow-up report concluded that: "...there is no capacity to support further large scale electricity generation biomass plants from the domestic wood fibre resource." A plan to build in Edinburgh a 200 MW biomass plant which would have imported 83% of its wood, was withdrawn by Forth Energy in 2012 but the energy company E.ON has constructed a 44 MW biomass power station at Lockerbie using locally sourced crops. A 2007 article by Renew Scotland claimed that automatic wood pellet boilers could be as convenient to use as conventional central heating systems. These boilers might be cheaper to run and, by using locally produced wood fuel, could try to be as carbon neutral as possible by using little energy for transportation.

There is also local potential for energy crops such as short-rotation willow or poplar coppice, miscanthus energy grass, agricultural wastes such as straw and manure, and forestry residues. These crops could provide 0.8 GW of generating capacity.

=== Incineration ===
There is a successful waste-to-energy incineration plant at Lerwick in Shetland which burns 22,000 tonnes (24,250 tons) of waste every year and provides district heating to more than 600 customers. Although such plants generate carbon emissions through the combustion of the biological material and plastic wastes (which derive from fossil fuels), they also reduce the damage done to the atmosphere from the creation of methane in landfill sites. This is a much more damaging greenhouse gas than the carbon dioxide the burning process produces, although other systems which do not involve district heating may have a similar carbon footprint to straightforward landfill degradation.

== Solar energy ==
Source: Apricus

Solar radiation has strong seasonality in Scotland as a result of its latitude. In 2015, solar PV contributed 0.2% to Scotland's final energy consumption. In a 100% renewable scenario for 2050, it is estimated that solar PV would provide 7% of electricity. The UK's practicable resource is estimated at 7.2 TWh per year.

Despite Scotland's relatively low level of sunshine hours, solar thermal panels can work effectively as they are capable of producing hot water even in cloudy weather. The technology was developed in the 1970s and is well-established with various installers in place; for example, AES Solar based in Forres provided the panels for the Scottish Parliament building.

In 2022 solar power capacity in Scotland had reached 420MW. Government grants became available to low income households for solar power installations from 2022.

== Geothermal energy ==
Geothermal energy is obtained from thermal energy generated and stored in the Earth. The most common form of geothermal energy systems in Scotland provide heating through a ground source heat pump. These devices transfer energy from the thermal reservoir of the earth to the surface via shallow pipe works, utilising a heat exchanger. Ground source heat pumps generally achieve a Coefficient of performance of between 3–4, meaning for each unit of energy in, 3–4 units of useful heat energy is outputted. The carbon intensity of this energy is dependent on the carbon intensity of the electricity powering the pump.

Installation costs can vary from £7,000 to £10,000, and grants may be available from the CARES initiative operated by Local Energy Scotland. Up to 7.6 TWh of energy is available on an annual basis from this source.

Mine-water geothermal systems are also being explored, utilising the consistent ambient temperature of the earth to raise the temperature of water for heating by circulating it through unused mine tubes. The water will generally require further heating in order to reach a usable temperature. An example is the Glenalmond Street project in Shettleston, which uses a combination of solar and geothermal energy to heat 16 houses. Water in a coal mine 100 metres (328 ft) below ground level is heated by geothermal energy and maintained at a temperature of about 12 °C (54 °F) throughout the year. The warmed water is raised and passed through a heat pump, boosting the temperature to 55 °C (131 °F), and is then distributed to the houses providing heating to radiators.

There is also potential for geothermal energy production from decommissioned oil and gas fields.

== Complementary technologies ==
It is clear that if carbon emissions are to be reduced, a combination of increased production from renewables and decreased consumption of energy in general and fossil fuels in particular will be required. The Energy Technology Partnership provides a bridge between academic research in the energy sector and industry and aims to translate research into economic impact. Although also low-carbon, Torness – the only nuclear power station – is due to be closed in 2028 and no new nuclear power in Scotland built due to Scottish government opposition.

=== Grid management ===
Demand patterns are changing with the emergence of electric vehicles and the need to decarbonise heat. The Scottish Government has investigated various scenarios for energy supply in 2050 and in one called "An Electric Future", "electrical energy storage is widely integrated across the whole system" and "the EV fleet operates as a vast distributed energy store, capable of supporting local and national energy balancing" and "better insulated buildings mean that domestic energy demand has fallen significantly."

In 2007 Scottish and Southern Energy plc in conjunction with the University of Strathclyde began the implementation of a "Regional Power Zone" in the Orkney archipelago. This ground-breaking scheme (that may be the first of its kind in the world) involves "active network management" that will make better use of the existing infrastructure and allow a further 15 MW of new 'non-firm generation' output from renewables onto the network. In 2013, Orkney generated 103% of its total electricity needs from renewable sources. This figure rose to 128% in 2020, and Orkney has been hailed as an example to follow in the green energy market.

In January 2009 the government announced the launch of a "Marine Spatial Plan" to map the potential of the Pentland Firth and Orkney coasts and agreed to take part in a working group examining options for an offshore grid to connect renewable energy projects in the North Sea to on-shore national grids. The potential for such a scheme has been described as including acting as a "30 GW battery for Europe's clean energy". The initiative has been awarded a Scottish Awards for Quality in Planning in 2016.

In August 2013 Scottish Hydro Electric Power Distribution connected a 2 MW lithium-ion battery at Kirkwall Power Station. This was the UK's first large-scale battery connected to a local electricity distribution network. There are other demand management initiatives being developed. For example, Sunamp, a company based in East Lothian, secured a £4.5 million investment in 2020 to develop its heat storage, which store energy that can then be used to heat water. A 50MW/100MWh battery is being built at Wishaw near Glasgow, and a 50 MW battery started in 2023.

Much greater linkage to sell more electricity to England has been proposed, but this may not be viable if nodal electricity pricing is implemented in Britain. Norway has so far refused a Scotland-Norway interconnector.

=== Carbon sequestration ===
Also known as carbon capture and storage, this technology involves the storage of carbon dioxide (CO_{2}) that is a by-product of industrial processes through its injection into oil fields. It is not a form of renewable energy production, but it may be a way to significantly reduce the effect of fossil fuels whilst renewables are commercialised. The technology has been successfully pioneered in Norway. No commercial-scale projects exist in Scotland as yet although in 2020 the UK government allocated 800 million pounds to attempt to create carbon sequestration clusters by 2030 aimed at capturing carbon dioxide emissions from heavy industry.

=== Hydrogen ===
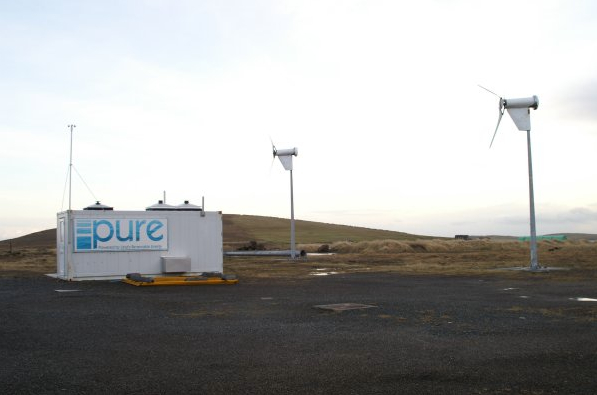
Hypod and windmills at the PURE site on Unst

Although hydrogen offers significant potential as an alternative to hydrocarbons as a carrier of energy, neither hydrogen itself nor the associated fuel cell technologies are sources of energy in themselves. Nevertheless, the combination of renewable technologies and hydrogen is of considerable interest to those seeking alternatives to fossil fuels. There are a number of Scottish projects involved in this research, supported by the Scottish Hydrogen & Fuel Cell Association (SHFCA).

The PURE project on Unst in Shetland is a training and research centre that uses a combination of the ample supplies of wind power and fuel cells to create a wind hydrogen system. Two 15 kW turbines are attached to a 'Hypod' fuel cell, which in turn provides power for heating systems, the creation of stored liquid hydrogen and an innovative fuel-cell driven car. The project is community-owned and part of the Unst Partnership, the community's development trust.

In July 2008 the SHFCA announced plans for a "hydrogen corridor" from Aberdeen to Peterhead. The proposal involves running hydrogen-powered buses along the A 90 and is supported by Aberdeenshire Council and the Royal Mail. The economics and practical application of hydrogen vehicles are being investigated by the University of Glasgow, among others. In 2015 the city of Aberdeen became the site of the UK's first hydrogen production and bus refuelling station and the council and announced the purchase of a further 10 hydrogen buses in 2020. The "Hydrogen Office" in Methil aims to demonstrate the benefits of improved energy efficiency and renewable and hydrogen energy systems.

A status report on hydrogen production in Shetland, published in September 2020, stated that Shetland Islands Council (SIC) had "joined a number of organisations and projects to drive forward plans to establish hydrogen as a future energy source for the isles and beyond". For example, it was a member of the Scottish Hydrogen Fuel Cell Association (SHFCA). The Orion project, to create an energy hub planned to use clean electricity in the development of "new technologies such as blue and green hydrogen generation".

Hydrogen production through electrolysis was well underway in early 2021 in Orkney where clean energy sources (wind, waves, tides) were producing excess electricity that could be used to create hydrogen which could be stored until needed. In November 2019, a spokesperson for the European Marine Energy Centre (EMEC) made this comment: "We're now looking towards the development of a hydrogen economy in Orkney". In late 2020, a plan was made to test the world's first hydrogen-fueled ferry here. One report suggested that, "if all goes well, hydrogen ferries could be sailing between Orkney's islands within six months". By that time, a plan was underway at Kirkwall Airport to add a hydrogen combustion engine system to the heating system in order to reduce the significant emissions that were created with older technology that heated buildings and water. This was part of the plan formulated by the Scottish government for the Highlands and Islands "to become the world's first net zero aviation region by 2040".

In December 2020 the Scottish government released a hydrogen policy statement with plans for incorporating blue and green hydrogen for use in heating, transportation and industry. The Scottish government also planned an investment of £100 million in the hydrogen sector "for the £180 million Emerging Energy Technologies Fund". Shetland Islands Council planned to obtain further specifics about the availability of funding. The government had already agreed that the production of "green" hydrogen from wind power near Sullom Voe Terminal was a valid plan. A December 2020 update stated that "the extensive terminal could also be used for direct refuelling of hydrogen-powered ships" and suggested that the fourth jetty at Sullom Voe "could be suitable for ammonia export".

== Local vs national concerns ==
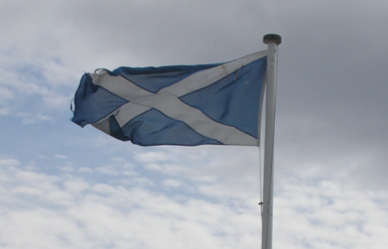
"A battle that pitches environmentalists against conservationists"

A significant feature of Scotland's renewable potential is that the resources are largely distant from the main centres of population. This is by no means coincidental. The power of wind, wave and tide on the north and west coasts and for hydro in the mountains makes for dramatic scenery, but sometimes harsh living conditions.

This happenstance of geography and climate has created various tensions. There is clearly a significant difference between a renewable energy production facility of modest size providing an island community with all its energy needs, and an industrial-scale power station in the same location that is designed to export power to far distant urban locations. Thus, plans for one of the world's largest onshore windfarms on the Hebridean Isle of Lewis have generated considerable debate. A related issue is the high-voltage Beauly–Denny power line which brings electricity from renewable projects in the north and west to the cities of the south. The matter went to a public inquiry and has been described by Ian Johnston of The Scotsman as a "battle that pitches environmentalists against conservationists and giant energy companies against aristocratic landowners and clan chiefs". In January 2010 Jim Mather, the Energy Minister, announced that the project would be going ahead, notwithstanding the more than 18,000 objections received. 53 km of the 132kV line inside the park was taken down and not replaced. The Beauly–Denny line was energized by Christmas 2015.

There is considerable support for community-scale energy projects. For example, Alex Salmond, the then First Minister of Scotland, has stated that "we can think big by delivering small" and aspired to have a "million Scottish households with access to their own or community renewable generation within ten years". The John Muir Trust has also stated that "the best renewable energy options around wild land are small-scale, sensitively sited and adjacent to the communities directly benefiting from them", although even community-owned schemes can prove controversial.

A related issue is the position of Scotland within the United Kingdom, a debate which highlights the contrast between the sparsely populated north of Scotland and the highly urbanised south and east of England. Although the ecological footprints of Scotland and England are similar the relationship between this footprint and the biocapacities of the respective countries are not. Scotland's biocapacity (a measure of the biologically productive area) is 4.52 global hectares (gha) per head, some 15% less than the current ecological effect. In other words, with a 15% reduction in consumption, the Scottish population could live within the productive capacity of the land to support them. However, the UK ecological footprint is more than three times the biocapacity, which is only 1.6 gha, amongst the lowest in Europe. Thus, to achieve the same end in the UK context, consumption would have to be reduced by about 66%.

The developed world's economy is very dependent on 'point-source' fossil fuels. Scotland, as a relatively sparsely populated country with significant renewable resources, is in a unique position to demonstrate how the transition to a low-carbon, widely distributed energy economy may be undertaken. A balance will need to be struck between supporting this transition and providing exports to the economies of densely populated regions in the Central Belt and elsewhere, as they seek their own solutions. The tension between local and national needs in the Scottish context may therefore also play out on the wider UK and European stage.

== Promotion of renewables ==
Growing national concerns regarding peak oil and climate change have driven the subject of renewable energy high up the political agenda. Various public bodies and public-private partnerships have been created to develop the potential. The Forum for Renewable Energy Development in Scotland, (FREDS) is a partnership between industry, academia and government aimed at enabling Scotland to capitalise on its renewable energy resource. The Scottish Renewables Forum is an important intermediary organisation for the industry, hosting the annual Green Energy Awards. Community Energy Scotland provides advice, funding and finance for renewable energy projects developed by community groups. Aberdeen Renewable Energy Group (AREG) is a public-private partnership created to identify and promote renewable energy opportunities for businesses in the northeast. In 2009 AREG formed an alliance with North Scotland Industries Group to help promote the North of Scotland as an "international renewable energy hub".

The Forestry Commission is active in promoting biomass potential. The Climate Change Business Delivery Group aims to act as a way for businesses to share best practices and address the climate change challenge. Numerous universities are playing a role in supporting energy research under the Supergen programme, including fuel cell research at St Andrews, marine technologies at Edinburgh, distributed power systems at Strathclyde and biomass crops at the UHI Millennium Institute's Orkney College.

In 2010 the Scotcampus student Freshers' Festivals held in Edinburgh and Glasgow were powered entirely by renewable energy in a bid to raise awareness among young people.

In July 2009 Friends of the Earth, the Royal Society for the Protection of Birds, World Development Movement and World Wildlife Fund published a study called "The Power of Scotland Renewed." This study argued that the country could meet all its electricity needs by 2030 without the requirement for either nuclear or fossil fuel powered installations. In 2013, a YouGov energy survey concluded that:

New YouGov research for Scottish Renewables shows Scots are twice as likely to favour wind power over nuclear or shale gas. More than six in ten (62%) people in Scotland say they would support large-scale wind projects in their local area, more than double the number who said they would be generally for shale gas (24%) and almost twice as much as nuclear (32%). Hydro power is the most popular energy source for large-scale projects in Scotland, with an overwhelming majority (80%) being in favour.

The Scottish Government's energy plans have called for 100% of electricity consumption to be generated through renewable sources and that by 2030 half of total energy consumption (including heat and transportation) will be met from renewables.

=== Political landscape ===
Energy policy in Scotland is a "reserved" issue, i.e. responsibility for it lies with the UK government. Former First Minister of Scotland and SNP leader Nicola Sturgeon has accused them of having a "complete lack of vision and ambition over the energy technologies of the future" and compared this with her view that the Scottish Government is "already a world leader" in tackling the issue. During the referendum on Scottish independence in 2014 Scotland's energy resources were a significant theme, and would likely be so again if there was another independence referendum. The Scottish Green Party are strongly supportive of "low carbon energy for all".

Scottish Labour (which is a section of the UK Labour Party) also supports what they call a "Green Industrial Revolution". The Scottish Conservatives' (who are a branch of the UK Conservative Party) party policy is to aim to "ensure 50 per cent of Scotland's energy comes from renewables by 2030". They are also supportive of additional nuclear energy production, which the SNP government oppose. The Scottish Liberal Democrats have a "commitment to 100% of Scottish electricity to be from renewable sources."

The 2021 United Nations Climate Change Conference (COP26) was held in Glasgow from 1 to 12 November 2021 under the presidency of the United Kingdom.

== See also ==
- List of power stations in Scotland

Global

- World energy consumption
- List of energy storage projects
- List of renewable energy topics by country
- Renewable energy development
- Hydrogen economy
- Renewable energy by country
