= Pelamis =

Pelamis can refer to:

- Pelamis platura, a species of sea snake
- Skipjack tuna, Katsuwonus pelamis
- Pelamis Wave Energy Converter, a design to capture wave energy
- Pelamis Wave Power, a company which developed the Pelamis Wave Energy Converter
