= Aguçadoura test site =

Portuguese offshore renewable energy test site

Aguçadoura Test Site
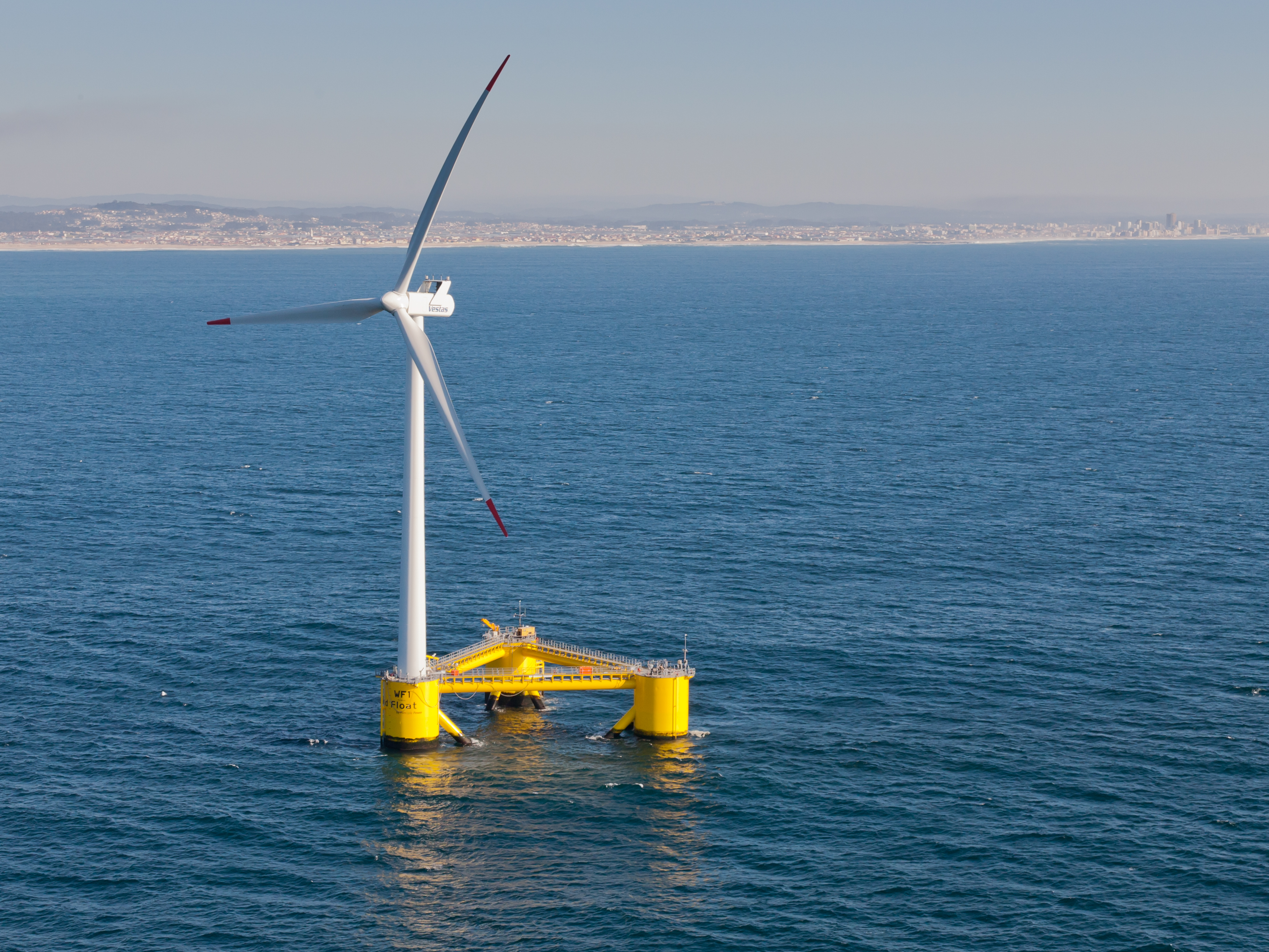
- Country: Portugal
- Location: Póvoa de Varzim
- Coordinates: 41°25′57″N 08°50′33″W

Wave power station
- Water body: Atlantic Ocean
- Distance from shore: 5 km (3 mi)

Power generation
- Units operational: 1 × 300 kW
- Make and model: CorPower C4
- Units decommissioned: 1 × 2 MW Archimedes Wave Swing; 3 × 750 kW Pelamis P1

The Aguçadoura test site is an offshore location in the north of Portugal where grid connected offshore renewable energy devices have been tested, for research and project demonstration. It is about 5 km (3 miles) off the coast of Aguçadoura, Póvoa de Varzim, about 35 km NNE of central Porto.

It was established in 2001, and as of 2024 four developers have tested devices there: the Archimedes Wave Swing, three Pelamis Wave Power P1 machines as the Aguçadoura Wave Farm, the Principle Power WindFloat, and CorPower Ocean's C4.

Since 2021, it has been managed by WavEC and OceanACT.

== Archimedes Wave Swing ==
In May 2004, a 2 MW (peak power output) Archimedes Wave Swing (AWS) was installed at Aguçadoura, after unsuccessful attempts in 2001 and 2002. The installation took three and a half days, and was eventually achieved by attaching the convertor to a pontoon and then submerging it and attaching to the seabed while the chamber remained floating.

The AWS device on the submersible pontoon foundation was 48 m long, 28 m wide and 35 m high, and sat on the sea bed beneath the waves. It had a 9.5 m diameter moving captor with a stroke of 7 m that moved with the waves at a maximum speed of 2.2 m/s. It was connected to the Portuguese grid by a 6 km long cable.

The testing was postponed until mid-September 2004, due to technical issues communicating with the device. At the end of October 2004 the testing license expired and the tests finished. The AWS intellectual property was later transferred to a Scottish company AWS Ocean Energy Ltd.

== Aguçadoura Wave Farm ==
Three Pelamis P1 wave energy converters were installed at Aguçadoura in September 2018, and connected to the Portuguese grid. These each had a rated peak power of nominally 750 kW, giving a total of 2.25 MW installed capacity. There were plans to install a further 25 Pelamis WECs, but this never happened.

The three machines were taken back to shore due to technical issues, but were never re-deployed due to the financial crisis. One of the project partners, Babcock & Brown pulled out after a major sale of assets to repay its debts. Another of the partners, Energias de Portugal (EDP), were not discouraged by the failure and signed an agreement with US-based Principle Power to develop floating offshore wind turbines.

== Principle Power WindFloat ==
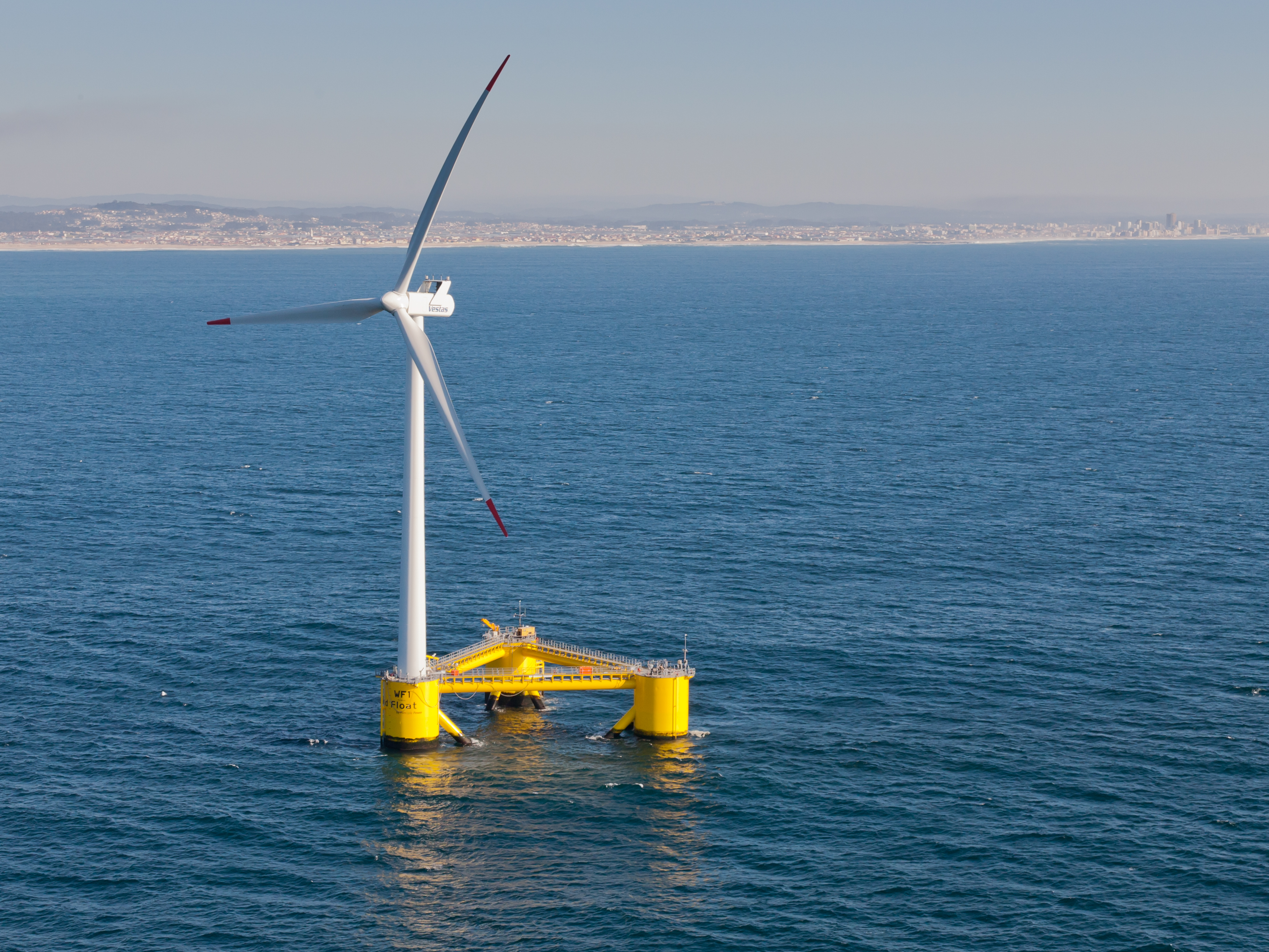
The WindFloat 1 Prototype installed at Aguçadoura

An initial agreement between Principle Power and EDP was made in 2009 to develop floating offshore wind turbines at the Aguçadoura site. A consortium called WindPlus was set up to develop the project; it included Principle Power, EDP, and Vestas.

In November 2011, the WindFloat 1 semi-submersible platform with a 2 MW Vestas wind turbine was installed around 5 km off the coast of Aguçaduora, following a 350 km tow from Setúbal. The turbine was 54 m high, and with the foundation weighed 1200 t, and can be installed in water depths of over 50 m. The structure was not permanently installed, but held in place by drag-embedment anchors similar to those used to moor floating oil platforms.

After five years, the testing programme was completed, the device having survived 17 m high waves, wind speeds of up to 111 km/h, and generated 17 GWh of renewable electricity for the Portuguese grid. The design of the platform was approved by certification body Bureau Veritas in April 2016. The WindFloat 1 foundation was then re-used for phase 1 of the Kincardine floating offshore wind farm.

The WindPlus consortium has since developed the 25 MW WindFloat Atlantic project, about 20 km off the coast of Viana do Castelo, some 30 km North of Aguçadoura. This has three WindFloat foundations each with a Vestas V164-8.4MW turbine, which began supplying power in January 2020.

== CorPower Ocean HiWave-5 ==
In late 2020, CorPower Ocean secured a 10-year licence from the Portuguese Directorate-General for Natural Resources that would allow them to test an array of CorPower wave energy converters (WECs) at the Aguçadoura site within the HiWave-5 project. A new subsea electricity cable was installed in Autumn 2022. The first CorPower C4 WEC was installed in September 2023, and started exporting to the Portuguese electricity grid in October 2023. It is planned to install a further three C5 WECs as a demonstration of a CorPack wave cluster.
