= Siadar Wave Power Station =

- Official name: Siadar Wave Energy Project
- Country: Scotland, United Kingdom
- Location: Siadar Bay, Lewis
- Coordinates: 58.3358°N 6.7856°W
- Status: Proposed
- Construction cost: £30 million

Wave power station
- Type: oscillating water column
- Distance from shore: 400 m (1,312 ft)

Power generation
- Nameplate capacity: 4 MW

The Siadar Wave Power Station (also known as Siadar Wave Energy Project or SWEP) was a proposed 4 MW wave farm 400 metres (1,300 ft) off the shore of Siadar Bay, in Lewis, Scotland. The £30 million project, was to be built by Wavegen, received Scottish Government approval on 22 January 2009. Originally, the project was developed in cooperation with npower Renewables. However, in August 2011, npower Renewables left the project. In 2012 project was cancelled.

The wave station was proposed to be based on oscillating water column technology. A 200-metre (660 ft) causeway will be constructed, and a breakwater with 10 concrete caissons, containing 36 to 40 Wells turbines, placed on the seabed.

== See also ==
- Wave Energy
- Renewable energy in Scotland
- European Marine Energy Centre
- Aegir wave farm
- Pelamis Wave Power
- Aquamarine Power
