= St John's Church, Baillieston =

St John's Church
- The Parish Church of Saint John the Evangelist
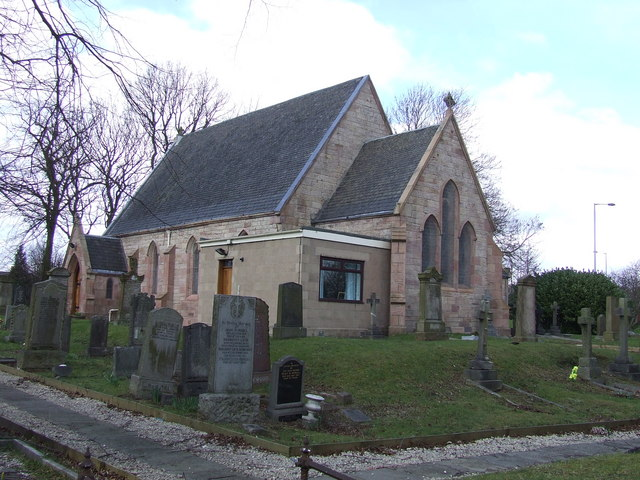
- St John's Church
- 55°51′12″N 4°06′35″W
- Location: Glasgow
- Country: Scotland
- Denomination: Scottish Episcopal Church
- Website: Church Website

History
- Status: Active
- Dedication: John the Evangelist
- Consecrated: 1851

Architecture
- Functional status: Parish church
- Architectural type: Church
- Style: Neo-Gothic
- Completed: 27 December 1850

Administration
- Diocese: Glasgow and Galloway
- Parish: East End Ministry

Clergy
- Bishop: Kevin Pearson

St John's Church, also known as St John's Baillieston, is a 19th-century parish church of the Scottish Episcopal Church, in the Baillieston area of Glasgow, Scotland.

== History ==
The church was built in the Neo-Gothic style in 1850, and was opened on 27 December 1850. It was then consecrated in 1851, and became an Incumbency. St John's was united with St Serf's Church, Shettleston and St Kentigern's, Dennistoun in January 1996, to form a united parish named East End Ministry.
