= Shettleston New Church =

- Shettleston New Parish Church
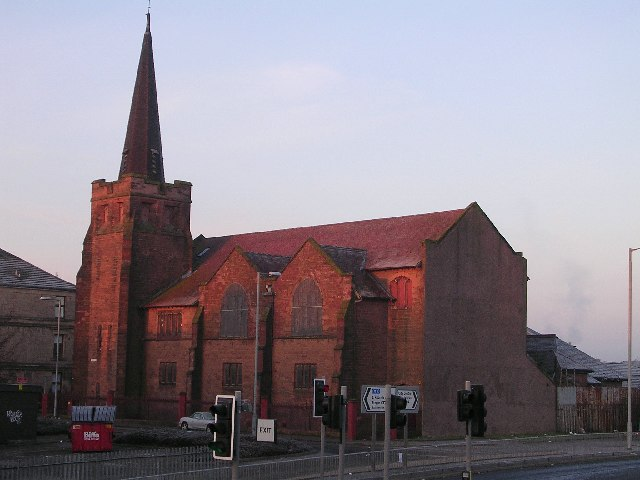
- Shettleston New Church
- 55°51′08″N 4°09′44″W
- Location: Glasgow
- Country: Scotland
- Denomination: Church of Scotland
- Website: shettlestonnewchurch.com

History
- Former name: Eastbank Parish Church
- Status: Active

Architecture
- Functional status: Parish church
- Architect: W. G. Rowan
- Architectural type: Church
- Style: Neo-Gothic
- Years built: 1901–1904
- Groundbreaking: 11 October 1902

Administration
- Parish: Shettleston

Listed Building – Category B
- Designated: 15 December 1970
- Reference no.: LB33641

Shettleston New Church is an early 20th-century church building of the Church of Scotland in the Shettleston district of Glasgow, Scotland.

== History of the church building ==
The church was designed in the Neo-Gothic style by W. G. Rowan in 1897. It was built between 1901 and 1904 using Old Red Sandstone. The memorial stone was laid on 11 October 1902. A steeple with a spire was also built with buttresses stepped in at the narrow top. Art nouveau sculptures were also built at the doorway, including a big traceried gable window over the west door. The church hall was built in 1899.

== Interior ==
The interior roof of the church is made of 90 square panels which include the inscription of the Te Deum. The pipe organ was installed in 1904 and is still in use. The large stained glass window above the main door is a WWI memorial.

== History of the congregation ==
The parish was founded by the United Presbyterian Church in 1896, where services where held at Eastmuir School. Once the church was built, the congregation became known as Eastbank United Free Church after the union between the Free Church and the United Presbyterian Church. It then became Eastbank Parish Church after the union with the Church of Scotland in 1929. It retained that name for most of its existence until 2007 when the congregation of Carntyne Old Church (converted into flats) united with Eastbank to form Shettleston New Church.
