= Aegir Wave Farm =

- Country: off the south west of Shetland
- Location: Scotland, United Kingdom
- Coordinates: 59.97°N 1.45°W
- Status: Mothballed
- Owners: Vattenfall; Pelamis Wave Power

Wave power station
- Type: Surface-following attenuator

Power generation
- Make and model: Pelamis Wave Power
- Units planned: 100 MW

External links
- Website: www.aegirwave.com

The Aegir wave farm was a planned wave farm off the south west of Shetland. The project was developed by Aegir Wave Power, a 2009 formed joint venture of Vattenfall and the wave power technology developer Pelamis Wave Power. The wave farm would have had capacity from 10 MW potentially up to 100 MW. Following the collapse of Pelamis in November 2014, the project was cancelled by Vattenfall in February 2015.

== History ==
It was to have used around 25 Pelamis P2 converters. The first phase was intended to be installed by 2014, however, it was announced later that the company would file a planning application to Marine Scotland in 2014. The second phase would have consisted of an array of up to 14 converters with a total capacity of 10 MW. The third phase would have increased capacity up to 40 MW by 2023. After that, capacity may have been increased up to 100 MW. The project was dependent of construction of a transmission cable between Shetland and the mainland Scotland. Approval of the Viking Wind Farm at Shetland could promote the interconnector's project.

In November 2014 Pelamis went into administration after failing to secure enough funding to develop its devices. In February 2015 Vattenfall announced that it would liquidate Aegir.

== See also ==
- Renewable energy in Scotland
- European Marine Energy Centre
- Siadar Wave Power Station
