= Stephen Fullarton =

Stephen Fullarton (23 August 1919, Glasgow, Scotland - 29 February 2008, Edinburgh, Scotland) was the last survivor of the more than 500 Scottish men and women who volunteered to serve on the republican side in the Spanish Civil War.

== Early life ==
Fullarton, a native of Elvan Street, Shettleston, Glasgow, left school at 14 and worked to earn money for the upkeep of his family, a task made all the more onerous by the death of his father two years later. His early employment included a role scooping up manure from local streets to sell on, but he eventually worked his way to a mechanical engineering apprenticeship.

Through 1937, Fullarton saw footage of events in Spain which were to push him into action. "It was the bombing of civilians that really got on my nerves. I would go to the cinema and see that on the newsreel, see the women running with the bairns in their hands, eyes turned skywards for the planes, to see if they were coming."

He began to attend street meetings, listening to and imbibing the words of charismatic soap-box orators such as the returning International Brigader James Maley, a recent prisoner of war. Fullarton became increasingly involved with the cause of republican Spain, collecting money and non-perishable foods, and chalking local roads with announcements of street meetings. For him, the next step, volunteering for action in Spain, was merely a logical progression of actions rather than an ideological decision or the result of any coercion by local political groups.

== Spanish Civil War & World War II ==
In early 1938, with the Communist Party having agreed to his suitability for Spain, Fullarton informed a local friend, Willie Gauntlet, of the news. Gauntlet replied: "Oh. I'll go too." This was hardly atypical of the area – from Fullarton's close and the four surrounding it, he, Gauntlet and two other men, Jimmy Reid and Willie Dougan, were to serve in Spain. In March 1938, aged 18, Fullarton set off by train from Glasgow Central for London Euston alongside five other Scottish volunteers. In London, they purchased weekend train tickets for Paris so as not to arouse the suspicions of the authorities (Britain's non-interventionist government strictly forbade anyone from volunteering to fight in Spain, and invoked the 1870 Foreign Enlistment Act to make it illegal for them to do so).

From Paris, volunteers were transferred to the Spanish border for their surreptitious journey on foot across the Pyrenees. Having entered Spain, Fullarton was sent for a brief period of military training at Figueres, although this proved to be basic at best: fake wooden rifles were distributed for practice due to a shortage of the real thing. He was then assigned to the Major Attlee Company and in the early summer of 1938 moved to the Chabola Valley in preparation for the republican side's crossing of the River Ebro. Fullarton bonded with his fellow volunteers and attended lectures on political theory and ideology. "People would quote Lenin and Stalin by the yard. I realised how ignorant I was about these things. I didn't know about them at that time." When the Battle of the Ebro began in July 1938, Fullarton was at the centre of the action amidst relentless German aerial bombardment. "Every day we got it – an average of six or seven times. Twenty or 30 of them would come over and give us all they had, then strafe us with the machine guns", he said.

Fullarton was at high risk, and during intense fighting he was shot through the stomach. He lay, prone and silent, for several hours so as not to be identified by Franco's Nationalists. Without anaesthetics, doctors probed to find the bullet in his body with a long needle. As he wrote home from his sickbed: "The bullet made an ugly hole but I will soon be OK again. These explosive bullets that the fascists are using make a helluva mess of you. It enters you and only makes a small hole, but when it is inside it explodes and where it comes out it blows all the flesh with it." After a period of convalescence in Catalonia, on 23 December 1938, Fullarton was transported back to Great Britain, aged 19.

Back in Glasgow he struggled to find work, his name tainted by association with the Spanish war, an experience repeated when he tried to join the Royal Air Force. Fullarton was eventually able to join the RAF during the Second World War, serving in South Africa. This, however, did not stop the Foreign Office writing to him demanding a fee for the money it had paid towards his repatriation from Spain.

== Later life ==
Following his war years, Fullarton resumed work as an engineer and started a family. He read assiduously, enjoying the works of Robert Burns and William Shakespeare in particular, giving himself the education his tough upbringing had cut short. He and his wife Isabella MacDonald Fullarton (died 1968) had three children.
