= Kincardine floating offshore wind farm =

Offshore wind farm near Aberdeen, Scotland

Kincardine Offshore Windfarm
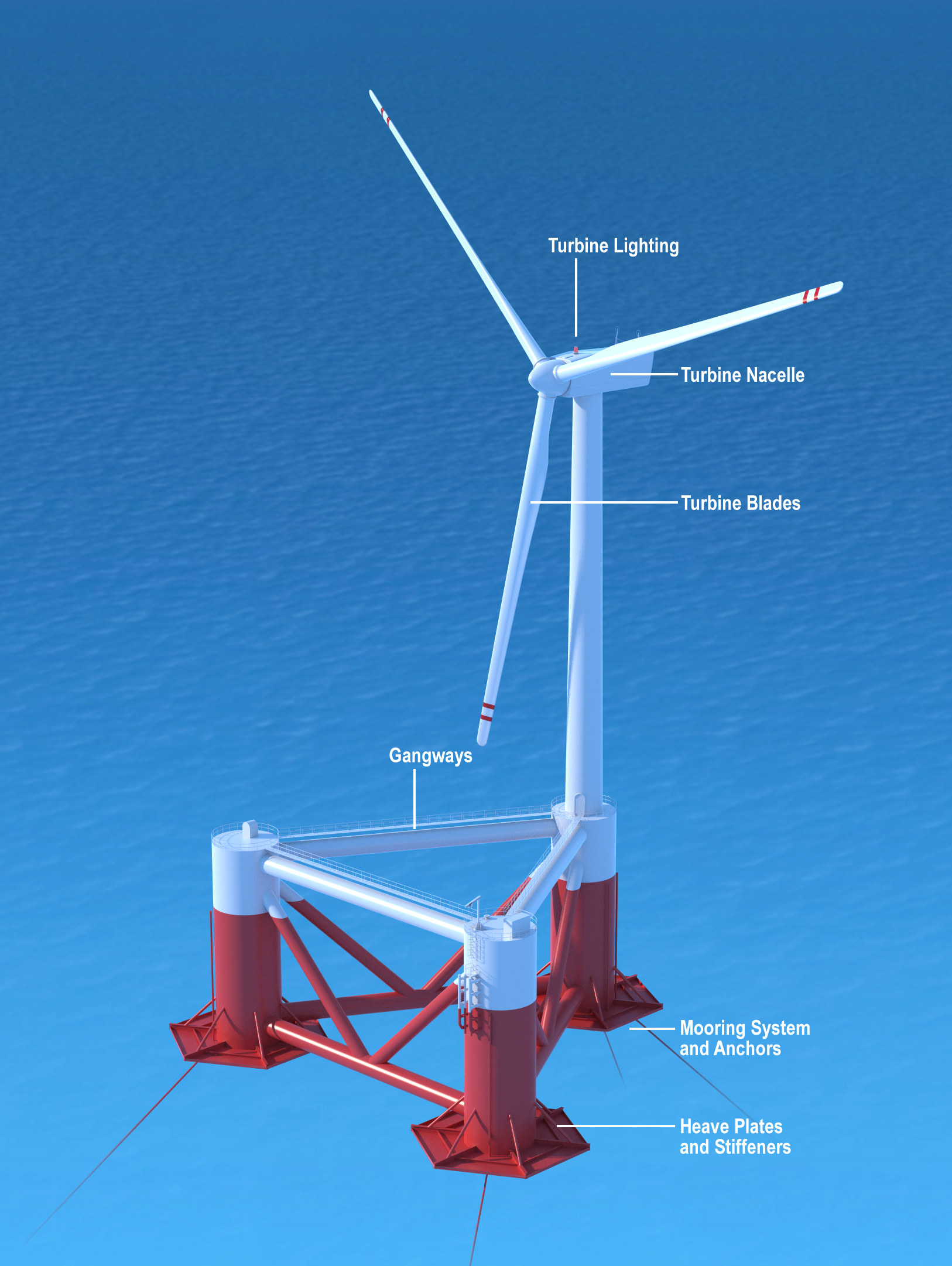
- Country: Scotland, UK
- Location: South-east of Aberdeen
- Coordinates: 57°00′17″N 1°51′35″W
- Status: Operational
- Commission date: 2018
- Owner: Kincardine Offshore Windfarm Ltd
- Operator: Cobra Wind

Wind farm
- Max. water depth: 80 m (260 ft)
- Distance from shore: 15 km (9.3 mi)
- Rotor diameter: 80 m (260 ft), 164 m (538 ft)

Power generation
- Units operational: 5 × 9.5 MW
- Make and model: MHI Vestas V164-9.5MW (5)
- Units decommissioned: 1 × 2 MW
- Nameplate capacity: 49.5 MW
- Annual net output: 200 GWh

The Kincardine floating offshore wind farm is located off the east coast of Scotland, about 15 km (9 mi) south-east of Aberdeen. It has an installed capacity of nearly 50 MW, and when commissioned in 2021 it was the world's largest wind farm with floating turbines.

It is a demonstration project that consists of six turbines, all mounted on semi-submersible platforms. The first turbine, a Vestas V80-2 MW, was installed in 2018. This was joined by five larger V164-9.5 MW turbines in 2021. The first turbine has since been decommissioned.

The project was developed by Kincardine Offshore Windfarm Ltd. (KOWL), initially comprising Pilot Offshore Renewables and Atkins, however this is now a joint venture between Flotation Energy and the Cobra Group.

Statkraft has a power purchase agreement to buy all of the power generated, estimated at over 200 GWh per year, equivalent to about 50,000 homes. This contract gives a guaranteed minimum price until 2029, reducing the financial risk of the project.

The project is located off the east coast of the historic county of Kincardineshire. However, it is not near the town of Kincardine, Fife.

== Technology ==
Each of the turbines is mounted on a triangular floating semi-submersible platform, the WindFloat® designed by Principle Power. These have three buoyant columns about 30 metres (100 ft) high and 50 metres (160 ft) apart. These are tethered to the seabed by cables, allowing them to be installed in much deeper waters than conventional (fixed) offshore wind turbines.

The wind turbine tower is mounted on one of the buoyant columns, as shown in the CAD rendering on the right. Power from the wind farm is exported via two subsea cables, each rated at 33 kV, which were supplied by Prysmian Group.

== History ==
Wind farm layout (2018)

Wind farm layout (2021)

Plans for the project were announced in 2014 by Pilot Offshore Renewables and Atkins, with the aim of starting construction in 2016 and generating power by 2018.

In March 2017, the Scottish Government approved plans for the Kincardine demonstration project. It was originally proposed to consist of eight turbines rated at 6 MW.

By November 2017, revised plans were announced to develop the project in two or more phases, in order to meet the Scottish Government deadline of October 2018 for eligibility for 3.5 Renewables Obligation Certificates (ROCs) for floating wind. An initial phase with a 2 MW turbine would be installed in 2018, followed by the remaining 48 MW in 2019 and 2020. The first turbine re-used the Windfloat 1 foundation that had been tested for five years at the Aguçadoura test site in Portugal. However, the substructure was only certified for use for a period of ten years after initial construction in 2011.

In 2016, the project was anticipated to cost around £250m, but by 2018 the costs had risen to around £500m.

The first turbine was assembled onto its foundation in the Port of Dundee, and on 16 August 2018 was towed out to the wind farm site by the Pacific Duchess and two tugs. The first power was exported on 18 September 2018, just meeting the ROC deadline. This turbine has been operating at the site since October 2018.

The floating foundations for the second phase were constructed in a fabrication yard in Ferrol, Spain. They were then towed to Rotterdam, where the 164 m (538 ft) diameter turbines with a tip height of 180 m (590 ft) were added. The first of the turbines was towed from Rotterdam to the site in December 2020, by the Boskalis anchor handling vessel Manta. Once on site, the turbines were connected to the pre-installed spread moorings.

By October 2021, all six turbines were commissioned and the project started commercial operation.

In July/August 2024, the generator of one of the turbines was replaced at sea, the first time any major component has ever been replaced at sea. Previously, turbines had to be returned to port for any significant maintenance. A crane supplied by LiftOff, was assembled on the turbine nacelle and used to lift the generator then lower it onto the floating foundation, where it was then transferred to an offshore supply vessel. The new generator was installed using the reverse of this process.
