= Aguçadoura Wave Farm =

Wave power station in Portugal

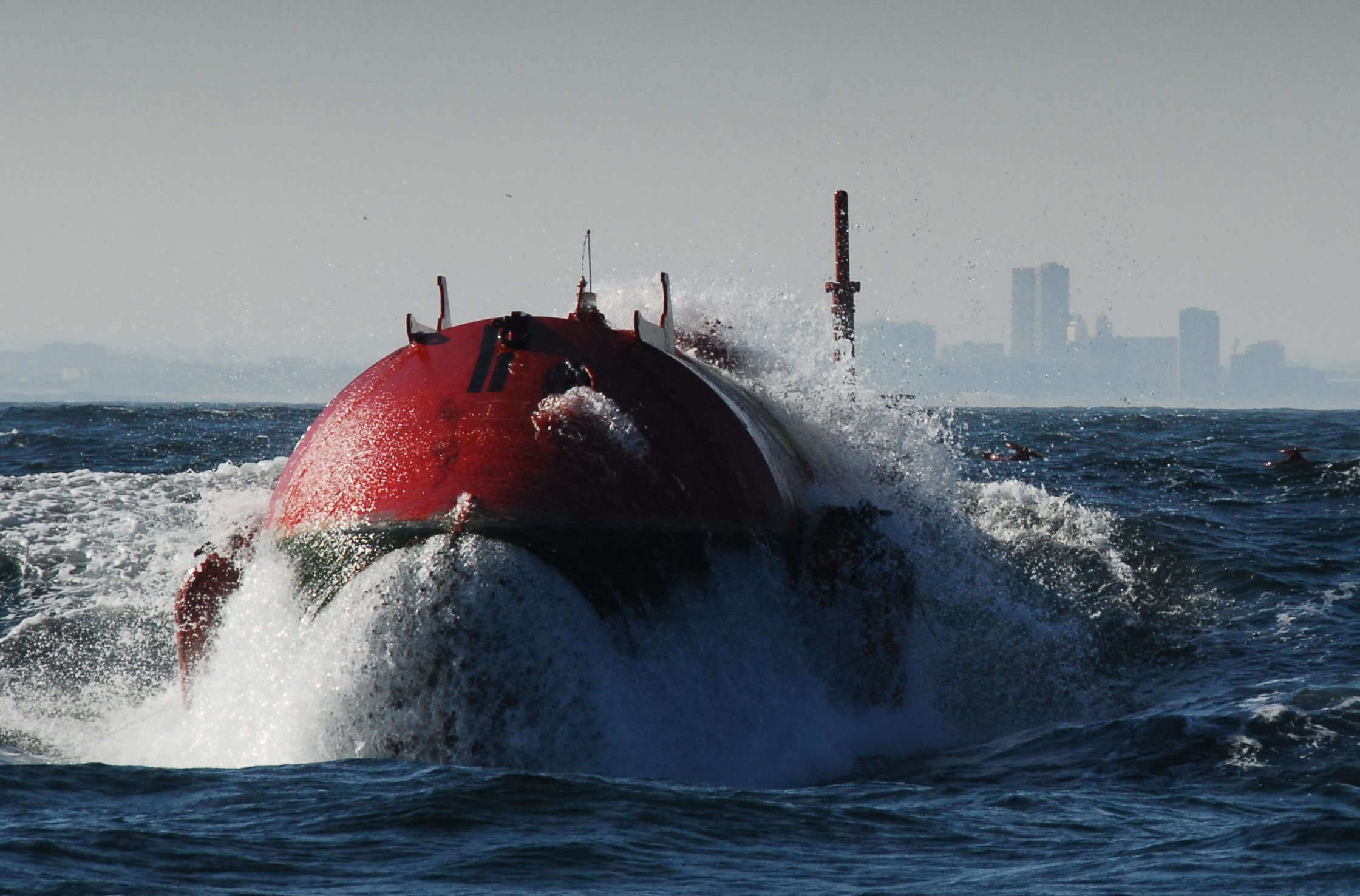
- Pelamis machine bursting through a wave.
- Country: Portugal
- Location: Póvoa de Varzim
- Coordinates: 41°25′57″N 08°50′33″W
- Status: Decommissioned
- Commission date: 23 September 2008
- Decommission date: November 2008
- Owner: Babcock & Brown

Wave power station
- Type: Surface-following attenuator
- Water body: Atlantic Ocean
- Distance from shore: 5 km (3 mi)

Power generation
- Make and model: Pelamis
- Units decommissioned: 3 × 750 kW
- Nameplate capacity: 2.25 MW

External links
- Commons: Related media on Commons

The Aguçadoura Wave Farm was a wave farm located 5 km (3 mi) offshore near Póvoa de Varzim north of Porto in Portugal. The farm was designed to use three Pelamis Wave Energy Converters to convert the motion of the ocean surface waves into electricity, totalling to 2.25 MW in total installed capacity.

The farm was officially opened on 23 September 2008, by the Portuguese Minister of Economy. The wave farm was shut down two months after the official opening in November 2008. It was reported to have cost €9m, but for these early projects the true costs are not always known.

The Pelamis devices were deployed at the Aguçadoura test site, which has previously and subsequently seen other wave energy and floating wind turbines tested there.

== Pelamis machines ==
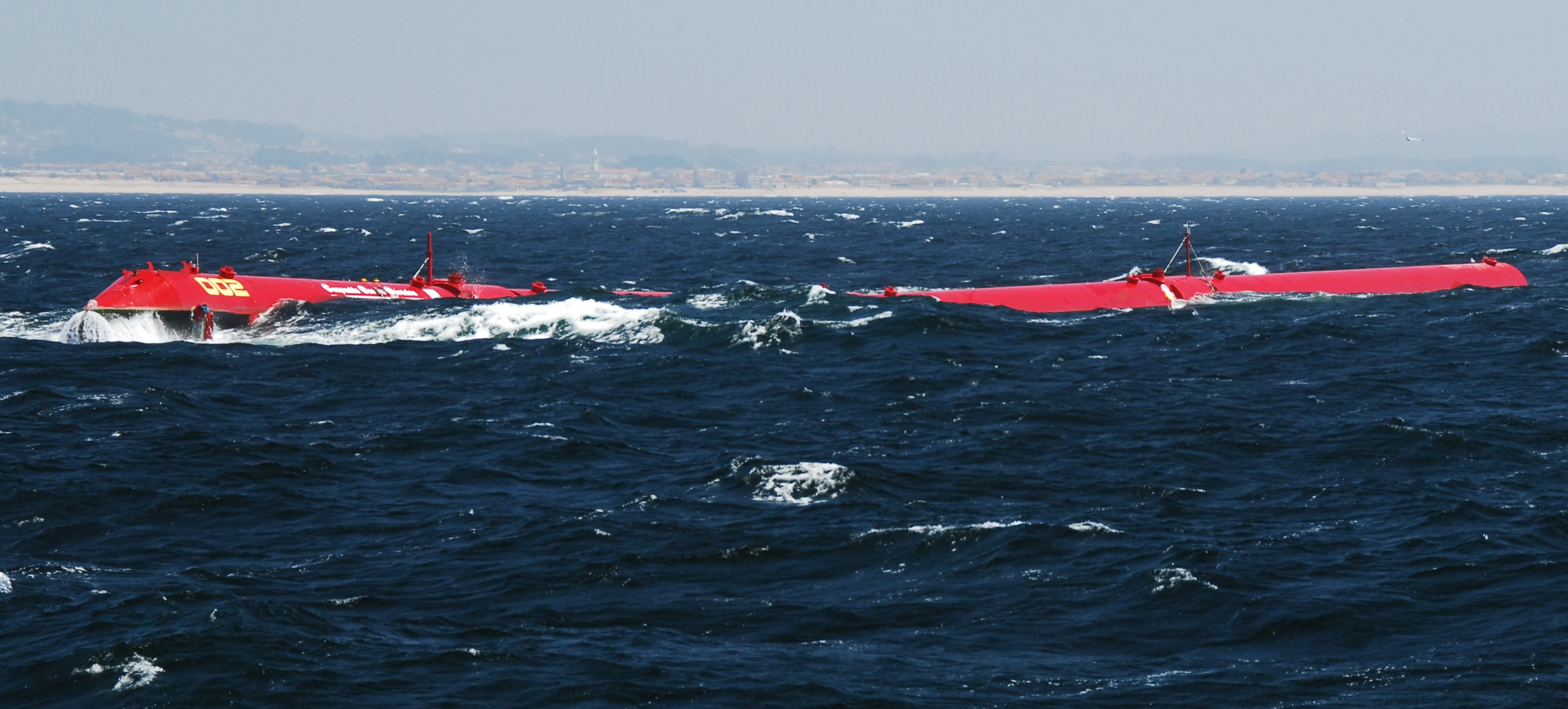
A Pelamis machine at the wave park.

Developed by the Scottish company Pelamis Wave Power, the Pelamis machine was made up of connected sections which flex and bend relative to one another as waves run along the structure. This motion is resisted by hydraulic rams which pump high pressure oil through hydraulic motors which in turn drive electrical generators.

The three machines which made up the Aguçadoura Wave Park were each rated at a peak output of 750 kW, giving an installed peak capacity of 2.25 MW, enough to meet the average electricity demand of more than 1,500 Portuguese homes. The average output from a Pelamis machine will depend on the wave resource in a particular area. The higher the resource the higher the average output. According to information on the Pelamis web site, it appears that the average power output for a Pelamis wave machine was about 150 kW.

The first machine was installed in July 2008, followed by the other two in September. There had been issues with foam-filled buoyancy tanks, although this was resolved. Further technical issues meant they were removed from site in November 2008.

The economic benefits of the wave farm were less than initially hoped due to its short lifespan and low power output. After a few months after its installation, the farm project had to be abandoned and the devices brought back to port.

== Project management ==
The project was a joint-venture between Pelamis Wave Power, Energias de Portugal, the Portuguese renewable energy company Enersis, and Australian infrastructure company Babcock & Brown.

The project was originally conceived by Enersis, which developed and financed the project and which was subsequently bought by Babcock & Brown in December 2005. In the last quarter of 2008, Babcock & Brown had its shares suspended and has been in a managed process of selling its assets, including the Aguçadoura project. In March 2009, Babcock & Brown went into voluntary administration.

In November 2008, the Pelamis machines were brought back to harbour at Leixões due to a technical problem with some of the bearings for which a solution had been found. However, the machines are likely to remain off-line until a new partner is found to take over Babcock & Brown's 77% share in the project. This seems unlikely, because according to Pelamis "those machines are sub-optimal" and the owner is trying to sell them.

Pelamis subsequently focused its efforts on the new P2 machine, two of which were tested in Orkney in Scotland beginning in 2010. Pelamis ceased operations in 2014; a P2 device was dismantled in 2016.

== See also ==
- List of largest power stations in the world
