= St Serf's Church, Shettleston =

St Serf's Church
- The Church of St Serf
- St Serf's Church
- 55°51′04″N 4°09′30″W
- Location: Glasgow
- Country: Scotland
- Denomination: Scottish Episcopal Church
- Website: Church Website

History
- Status: Active
- Dedication: Saint Serf
- Dedicated: 22 December 1934

Architecture
- Functional status: Church
- Architect(s): Whyte and Galloway
- Architectural type: Church

Administration
- Diocese: Glasgow and Galloway
- Parish: East End Ministry

Clergy
- Bishop: Kevin Pearson

St Serf's Church is an early 20th-century church building of the Scottish Episcopal Church, located in the Shettleston area of Glasgow.

== History ==
The Episcopal congregation of Shettleston was founded in 1899 by the Reverend George Crane who was the Rector of St John's Church in Baillieston. By 1914, the congregation was using Eastmuir School for worship services, until 1917, when a corrugated iron building was built to serve as a mission as part of the parish of St John's in Baillieston.

The present church was built in the early 1930s and consecrated on 22 December 1934. It was built on designs by Whyte and Galloway. The mission was transferred as part of the parish of Christ Church in Bridgeton in 1941. It later became a mission of St Mary's Cathedral in 1948. It became part of St John's Baillieston again in 1970, until January 1996, when St Serf's united with St John's Baillieston and St Kentigern's Dennistoun to form a united parish called East End Team Ministry.
