= Energy policy of Scotland =

Certain aspects of Energy policy in Scotland have been specifically reserved to the UK parliament under the terms of the Scotland Act 1998 that created the devolved Scottish Parliament. This does not mean all aspects of energy are reserved however, for example the Scottish Government planned an abortive attempt at launching their own energy company. Additionally, since planning is a matter that has been devolved, the Scottish government has the ability to shape the direction of energy generation in Scotland by approving or refusing new projects.

In 2004, the Enterprise Committee of the Scottish Parliament called for the development of a 'fully fledged' Scottish energy policy.

The SNP Government that took power in May 2007 specifically included the word 'energy' in a portfolio title when the junior ministerial position of Minister for Enterprise, Energy and Tourism was created to replace the position of 'Minister for Enterprise and Lifelong Learning'.

== Fossil fuels ==
The closure of the Longannet power station in March 2016 ended coal-fired power production in Scotland.

== Renewable energy ==
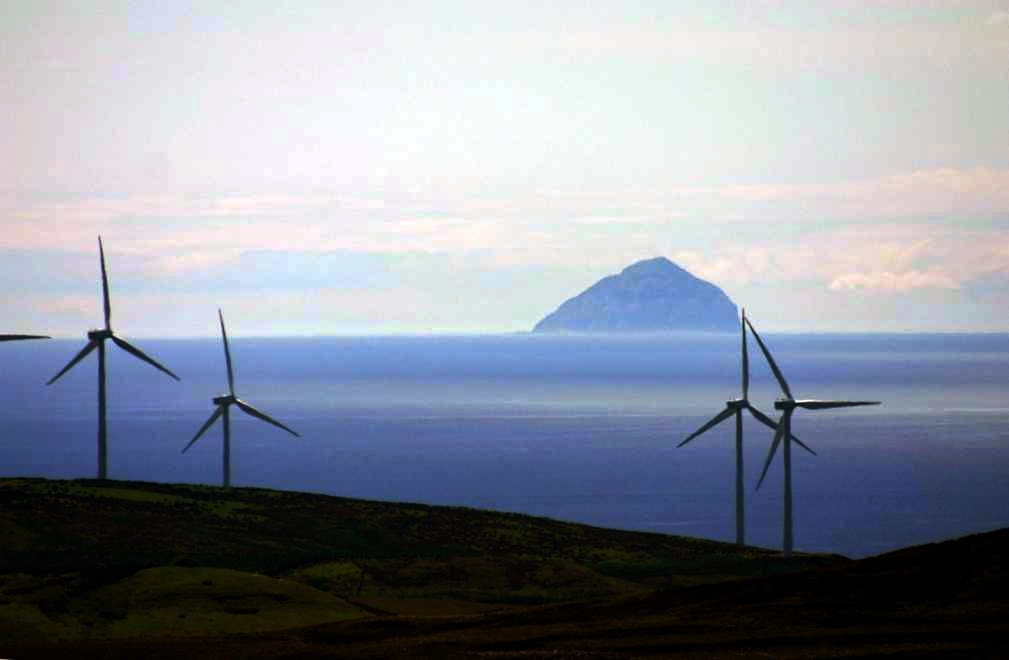
Wind, wave and tide make up more than 80% of Scotland's renewable energy potential.

The production of renewable energy in Scotland is an issue that has come to the fore in technical, economic, and political terms during the opening years of the 21st century. The natural resource base for renewable energy is extraordinary by European, and even global standards, with the most important potential sources being wind, wave, and tide.

At the end of 2011, there was 4,796 megawatts (MW) of installed renewables electricity capacity in Scotland, an increase of 9.5 per cent (416 MW) on the end of 2010. Renewable electricity generation in 2011 was a record high at 13,750 GWh - an increase of 44.5 per cent on 2010. Around 35 per cent of Scotland’s electricity came from renewables in 2011, exceeding the Scottish Government’s target of 31 per cent. Scotland contributed almost 40 per cent of the UK’s renewables output in 2011.

Continuing improvements in engineering and economics are enabling more of the renewable resources to be utilised. Fears regarding "peak oil" and climate change have driven the subject high up the political agenda and are also encouraging the use of various biofuels. Although the finances of many projects remain either speculative or dependent on market incentives, it is probable that there has been a significant, and in all likelihood long-term change, in the underpinning economics.

In addition to planned increases in both large-scale generating capacity and microsystems using renewable sources, various related schemes to reduce carbon emissions are being researched. Although there is significant support from the public, private and community-led sectors, concerns about the effect of the technologies on the natural environment have been expressed. There is also an emerging political debate about the relationship between the siting, and the ownership and control of these widely distributed resources.

A continuing political debate surrounds the uptake and the incentivisation schemes available for renewable technologies in Scotland. There are tensions over the disparity in costs between renewable installations in Scotland compared to those in England with suggestion that this should be recognised by the UK government.

== Nuclear power ==
When the UK Government announced an energy review in early 2006, the Scottish National Party (SNP) and others made clear their view that Scotland did not need new nuclear power stations. By January 2008, when the UK Government gave the go-ahead for a new generation of nuclear power stations to be built across the UK, the SNP formed the Scottish Government and First Minister Alex Salmond made clear there was "no chance" of more nuclear power stations being built in Scotland. The Government's stance was backed by the Scottish Parliament which voted 63-58 to support the Scottish Government's policy of opposing new nuclear power stations.

== Beauly-Denny power line ==
A proposed 400 kV upgrade to the existing 132 kV transmission network, seen as key to future expansion was held up in planning for three years. There was vocal opposition from some sectors and strong support from other sectors. Objections were principally on the basis of the visual impact of the pylons running through the edge of the Cairngorms National Park. 53 km of the 132kV line inside the park was taken down and not replaced. The 220 km circuit will run from Beauly, west of Inverness to Denny, west of Falkirk near Edinburgh.

In 2008, the first major independent study associated with the Scottish Government’s renewable energy targets concluded that the upgrade of the Beauly-Denny power line will be a key to future development.

In January 2010, the Scottish Government approved the upgrade to the Beauly to Denny transmission line, which was energized by Christmas 2015.

== See also ==
- North Sea oil
- Nuclear power in Scotland
- Renewable energy in Scotland
