= Shettleston =

Coordinates: 55.850023°N 4.170712°W

Shettleston: Scottish Gaelic: Baile Nighean Sheadna
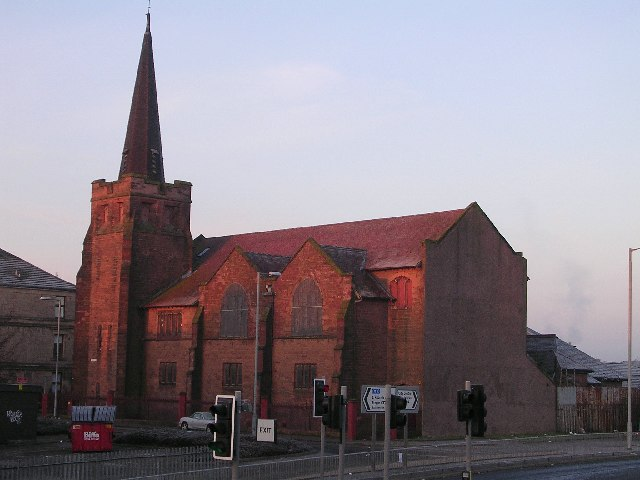
- Shettleston New Church

- Location within Glasgow
- OS grid reference: NS642640
- Council area: Glasgow City Council
- Lieutenancy area: Glasgow
- Country: Scotland
- Sovereign state: United Kingdom
- Post town: GLASGOW
- Postcode district: G32
- Dialling code: 0141
- Police: Scotland
- Fire: Scottish
- Ambulance: Scottish
- UK Parliament: Glasgow East
- Scottish Parliament: Glasgow Shettleston

Shettleston (Scottish Gaelic: Baile Nighean Sheadna) is an area in the east end of Glasgow in Scotland.

== Toponymy ==
Shettleston is referred to as villa filie Sadin and villa Inineschadin in medieval sources, representing Gaelic baile inghine Seadna ("farm or vill of Seadna's daughter"). Later, the Gaelic name was displaced by the Scots Shedinstoun, of which the modern name is a corruption.

== History ==
Like several areas of Glasgow, Shettleston was originally a small village on its outer edge, lying within Lanarkshire. It was incorporated into Glasgow in 1912. Today Shettleston – the heart of a local authority ward of the same name – lies between the neighbouring areas of Parkhead to the west, and Baillieston to the east, and is about 2.5 miles (4.0 km) from the city centre. Informally, it incorporates the neighbourhoods of Budhill, and Greenfield immediately to the north, although they fall within another Scottish Parliament constituency and Glasgow City Council ward; however, the Sandyhills neighbourhood to the south-east has the same administration as Shettleston in all respects. The area is well served by public transport, lying on the A89 road.

The Palaceum Bar, Shettleston in 2004.

Housing in Kenmore Street, Shettleston in 2004.

Shettleston railway station on the North Clyde line of the ScotRail local railway network provides a direct link to Glasgow Queen Street. It once was linked to Hamilton by the North British Railway, but this line has long since been closed.

In the late 1970s into the mid-1980s, Shettleston, like many other districts in the East End, benefited greatly from the Glasgow Eastern Area Renewal (GEAR) initiative, and much regeneration took place during this period. The area's housing stock was substantially upgraded with tenements being sandblasted and internally refurbished, and coal fires were replaced with gas central heating. There was also support for small business with a new industrial estate on Annick Street in 1980. Landscaped areas were created on sites where derelict housing and industrial buildings that were beyond repair had been demolished. GEAR also saw several of Shettleston's major public buildings replaced with new structures - a new police station in 1983, whilst several medical and dental practices were brought under one roof in a new medical centre in 1985. Early 1986 saw the opening of the long-awaited new building for Eastbank Academy.

In the early years of the 21st century, Shettleston was identified as the only place in the United Kingdom where life expectancy was falling. The reasons for the decline included poor diet and remarkably high smoking rates; neighbouring Easterhouse does not fare much better.

Shettleston was badly affected by the 2002 Glasgow floods.

== Education ==
Shettleston contains three non-denominational schools; Eastbank Academy, founded in 1894 serves as the area's main secondary school, and was rebuilt in the mid-1980s and then expanded in the early 2000s. Two of its feeder primary schools, namely Eastbank Primary School (originally part of Eastbank Academy, but became fully independent in 1968), and Wellshot Primary School - lie within its notional boundaries. Thorntree Primary School and Wellshot Primary School lie on Shettleston's fringes with Carntyne and Tollcross, respectively. St Paul's RC Primary School is also located in the nearby Sandyhills area. The John Wheatley College originally existed in the area from 1989 to 2007 (in the former Eastbank Academy buildings), before it moved to its present site in Haghill.

Now defunct schools in the area include Shettleston Nursery on Old Shettleston Road, and St Mark's (RC) Primary School.

== Churches ==
Shettleston has a number of churches of all denominations, St Paul's (RC), Shettleston Baptist Church, St Serf's Episcopal Church, Shettleston Trinity Church, Shettleston New Church of Scotland (formerly Eastbank Parish Church), Romanian Orthodox Church in Shettleston Old Parish Church Halls, the Shettleston Old Church Halls was home to a number of community groups, including the 94th Glasgow (1st Shettleston) Company of the Boys' Brigade, founded in 1893. The church closed and parishioners were amalgamated with the Church of Scotland in Tollcross, due to building falling into disrepair in 2016 and as of 2017, is currently up for sale. In 2018 the 94th Glasgow Boys' Brigade moved base to Shettleston New Church near Aldi and Tesco on Old Shettleston Road/Annick Street. St Barnabas RC Church in Darleith St, Shettleston am sure is still an active Church.

== Sport ==
Glasgow United (formerly Shettleston Juniors) is the local football club, having been founded in 1903 and play in the West of Scotland Football League Conference B.

== Military cadet associations ==
- 1089 (7th Glasgow) Squadron, Air Training Corps.
- 'E' Platoon (Royal Highland Fusiliers), 'Normandy' Company, Glasgow & Lanarkshire Battalion, Army Cadet Force (Colloquially known as the 'Beardmore Cadets').

Both units have their headquarters in Killin Street, Shettleston.

== Notable people ==
- Junior Campbell, pop musician with 1960s band 'The Marmalade', and composer of the music for Thomas the Tank Engine and Friends.
- Stephen Fullarton (1919–2008), International Brigades paramilitary soldier in the Spanish Civil War.
- Janey Godley (1961-2024), comedian.
- Cliff Hanley (1922–1999), wrote the lyrics of Scotland's anthem Scotland the Brave.
- Peter McAleese (1942–2024), soldier.
- Archie Macpherson Sports journalist/football commentator.
- Alistair MacLean (1922–1987), 20th century novelist.
- James Beaumont Neilson (1792–1865), engineer, created hot blast iron smelting.
- Charles Wilson, former editor of The Times.
