= Ocean Grazer =

The Ocean Grazer is a conceptual energy collection platform, projected to house several renewable energy generation modules, including wave energy, solar energy and wind energy. The development of the Ocean Grazer platform has been carried out by the University of Groningen in the Netherlands, since 2014, and now by a spin-out company Ocean Grazer BV.

The concept of the platform is currently on its version 3.0 centering on the modular design as opposed to the massiveness of the platform, as in the previous concepts. The majority of the harvested energy for all concepts is to be delivered by a wave energy converter that uses the motion of ocean surface waves to generate electrical energy.

The company has also developed the Ocean Battery, which is a modular subsea pumped-storage hydroelectricity system. Unveiled in 2021, the technology can be deployed around offshore wind farms or floating solar, to store excess power generated.

== Energy converter operation ==
The operating principle of the Ocean Grazer energy converter is to store potential energy by creating a hydraulic head, due to the differences in pressure between two reservoirs. All three concepts rely on this principle to function. The hydraulic head is created by circulating internal fluid from the lower to the upper reservoir via a novel hydro-mechanical power take off system, composed of distributed and coupled floaters. Each floater is linked to a separate multi-piston pumping system, consisting of differently sized pistons that regulate the amount of pumped fluid and that can be adapted to the surface wave conditions. Check valve systems are needed to minimize the back flow when the pistons return to their resting position. Lastly, similar to a hydroelectric plant, once enough fluid has been stored in the upper reservoir it can be circulated through a turbine system to generate electrical energy.

== Potential ==
There are advantages in using a device like the Ocean Grazer energy converter, such as:

- Renewable, clean energy production from ocean surface waves.
- The adaptability of the device with respect to the incoming wave conditions, granted by the different pumping settings in the power take off system.
- The storage capabilities offered by the device, allowing to generate electrical energy with a controllable output as in hydroelectric plants.
- The modular design and scalability (concept 2.0 onward).

== Challenges ==
There are also disadvantages in using a device like the Ocean Grazer energy converter, namely:

- The installation, manufacture and production are difficult and expensive.
- The connection to the electricity grid is still an open problem, a suitable solution to deliver the generated electrical energy needs to be developed.
- The moving parts, pumping systems and turbine systems in the device can create noise pollution and disrupt the habitat of different marine species.

== See also ==
- Wave power
- Hydropower
- Pumped-storage hydroelectricity
