= Pelamis Wave Energy Converter =

Technology that used the motion of ocean surface waves to create electricity

The Pelamis Wave Energy Converter was a technology that used the motion of ocean surface waves to create electricity. The machine was made up of connected sections which flex and bend as waves pass; it is this motion which is used to generate electricity.

Developed by the now defunct Scottish company Pelamis Wave Power (formerly Ocean Power Delivery), the Pelamis became the first offshore wave machine to generate electricity into the grid, when it was first connected to the UK grid in 2004. Pelamis Wave Power then went on to build and test five additional Pelamis machines: three first-generation P1 machines, which were tested in a farm off the coast of Portugal in 2009, and two second-generation machines, the Pelamis P2, were tested off Orkney between 2010 and 2014.

The company went into administration in November 2014, with the intellectual property transferred to the Scottish Government body Wave Energy Scotland.

== Operation principle ==
Pelamis was an attenuating wave energy converter. The machine responded to the curvature of the waves (their shape) rather than the wave height. As waves can only reach a certain curvature before naturally breaking, this limits the range of motion through which the machine must move but maintains large motion at the joints in small waves.

The Pelamis machine was an offshore wave energy converter, operating in water depths greater than 50 m. The machine consisted of a series of semi-submerged cylindrical sections linked by hinged joints. As waves pass along the length of the machine, the sections move relative to one another. The wave-induced motion of the sections is resisted by hydraulic cylinders which pump high pressure oil through hydraulic motors via smoothing hydraulic accumulators. The hydraulic motors drive electrical generators to produce electricity. Electricity from all the joints is fed down a single umbilical cable to a junction on the sea bed. Several devices can be connected and linked to shore through a single seabed cable.

== Development history ==
=== Prototype Pelamis machine ===
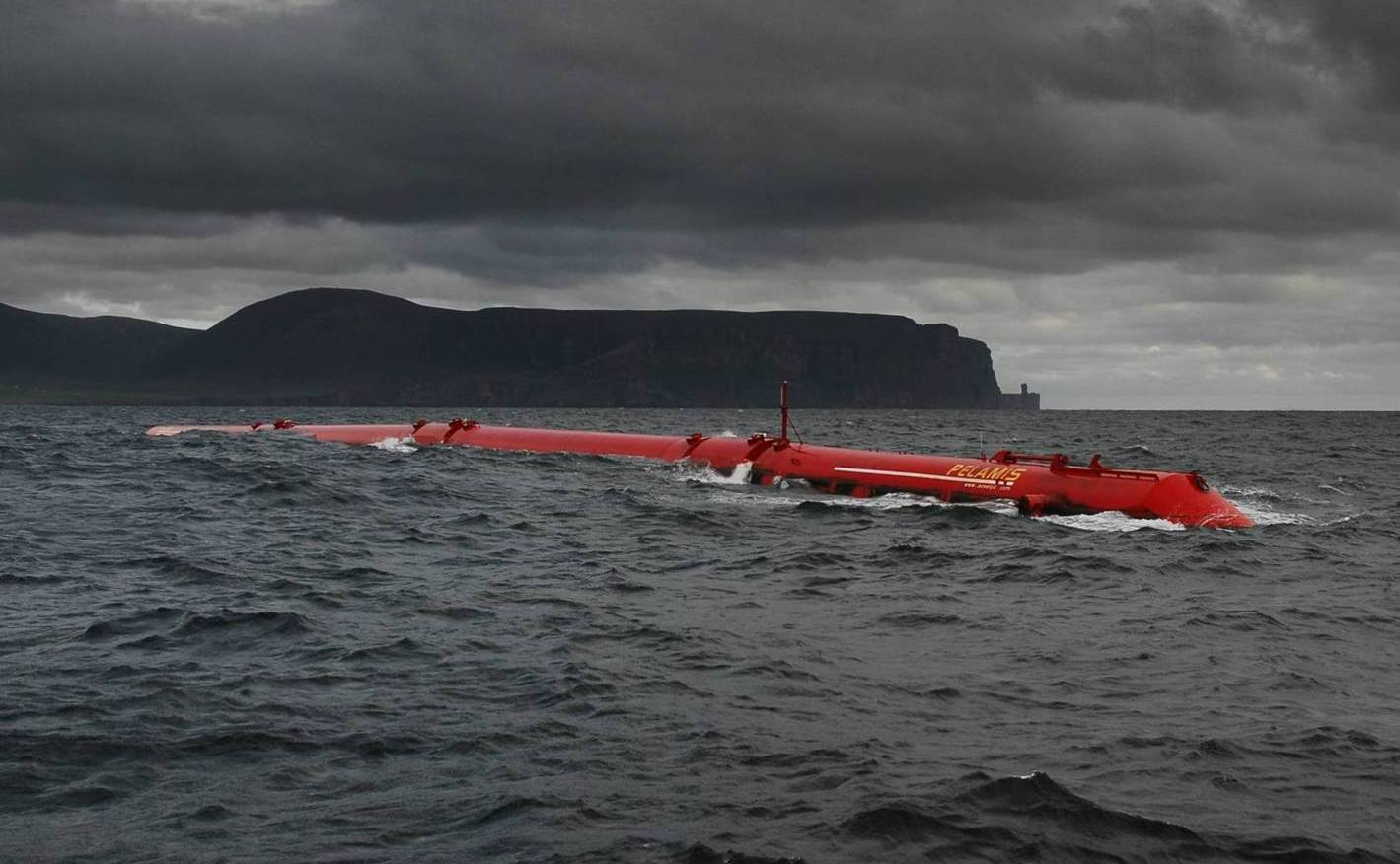
The Pelamis Prototype machine at EMEC, Orkney, Scotland, 2007

Pelamis Wave Power tested their first full-scale prototype at the Billia Croo wave test site at the European Marine Energy Centre (EMEC) in Orkney, Scotland between 2004 and 2007. The machine, which was rated at 750 kW, was the world's first offshore wave power machine to generate electricity into the grid system.

The prototype was 120 metres (390 ft) long and 3.5 metres (11 ft) in diameter. It had four tube sections coupled by three power conversion modules.

=== Aguçadoura Wave Farm ===
In 2008 Pelamis tested three first-generation, P1 Pelamis converters at the Aguçadoura Wave Farm. Located off the northwest coast of Portugal near Póvoa de Varzim, the farm had an installed capacity of 2.25 MW and was the world's first multiple machine wave power project. The project was part funded by Portuguese utility Enersis, at the time owned by Australian global investment company Babcock & Brown. The farm first generated electricity in July 2008 but was taken offline in November 2008 at the same time as Babcock & Brown encountered financial difficulties.

=== P2 Pelamis testing at EMEC ===
The P2 Pelamis design was Pelamis Wave Power's second generation Pelamis machine. The Pelamis P2 is 180 m long, 4 m in diameter, and approximately 1350 tonnes in weight. Consisting of five tube sections and four flexible joints, the design is longer and fatter than the previous P1 design.

In 2010, Pelamis Wave Power began tests of the first Pelamis P2 machine, again at the EMEC Billia Croo wave test site. The machine was owned by the German utility company, E.ON, and was the UK's first commercial supply contract in the marine energy sector. The P2-001 machine was named Vágr Atferð, Old Norse for Wave Power.

In March 2010 Pelamis Wave Power announced a second order for a P2 machine, from ScottishPower Renewables, part of Iberdrola Renovables. This second machine was first installed at EMEC in May 2012. The two utility companies announced that they would work together to share and collaborate in testing of the P2 Pelamis technology.

When not being tested at the Billa Croo test site, the machines were maintained at Lyness Harbour on this island of Hoy, Orkney. The Golden Wharf at Lyness was upgraded in 2010–2011 to host renewable energy projects.

Following the demise of the company, the P2-001 device, having completed over 15,000 hours of operation, was acquired by Wave Energy Scotland. The device was decommissioned in April 2016 and sold to the Orkney Island Council for £1. The other device, P2-002 was sold to the European Marine Energy Centre for use as a test rig.

=== Projects formerly in development ===
E.ON and ScottishPower Renewables announced plans to build larger projects using Pelamis machines in the waters off Orkney's west coast. Both companies won leases in 2010 from The Crown Estate, who own the seabed around the UK, for projects of up to 50 MW. The "Pentland Firth and Orkney Waters Leasing Round" was the world's first commercial-scale wave and tidal energy leasing opportunity.

== Etymology ==
Pelamis platurus is a yellow-bellied sea snake that lives in tropical and subtropical waters. It prefers shallow inshore waters.

== Hailong 1 ==
The Hailong (Dragon) 1 is a Chinese wave energy machine, reported to be a near perfect copy of the Pelamis, which began testing in 2015 in the South China Sea. It was reported to have been based on IP stolen from Pelamis during a 2011 heist.

== Disposal ==
July 2023 the Orkney Island Council sought tenders for the disposal of the Pelamis 2. "Orkney Islands Council (OIC) invite you to submit a proposal to take ownership and remove and dispose of the wave energy converter known as “Pelamis” P2. The “Pelamis” is a Wave Energy Converter which was utilised to capture wave energy from the sea in the waters off the sea in Orkney. It became redundant and came into the possession of OIC in 2017. It has been laid up at moorings off Lyness Wharf, Hoy, Orkney.

Upon an agreed date which shall be within 7 days of signing acceptance to the agreement the Contractor shall take ownership of Pelamis, and the responsibility for the upkeep, maintenance and security of the “Pelamis” will become the Contractor's responsibility. The Contractor will be required to have relevant and appropriate insurances in place at the time of change of ownership.

The contractor shall have the option to remove the Pelamis by sea to dismantle or dispose of the Pelamis at a regulated and certified recycling facility or to dismantle the Pelamis at Lyness Wharf and remove the components by road or by suitable marine transport and dispose of them at a regulated and certified recycling facility.

Should the Contractor wish to re-use the Pelamis for some other purpose this should be explained in full detail including the method of preservation, security and protection of the environment."

== Images ==
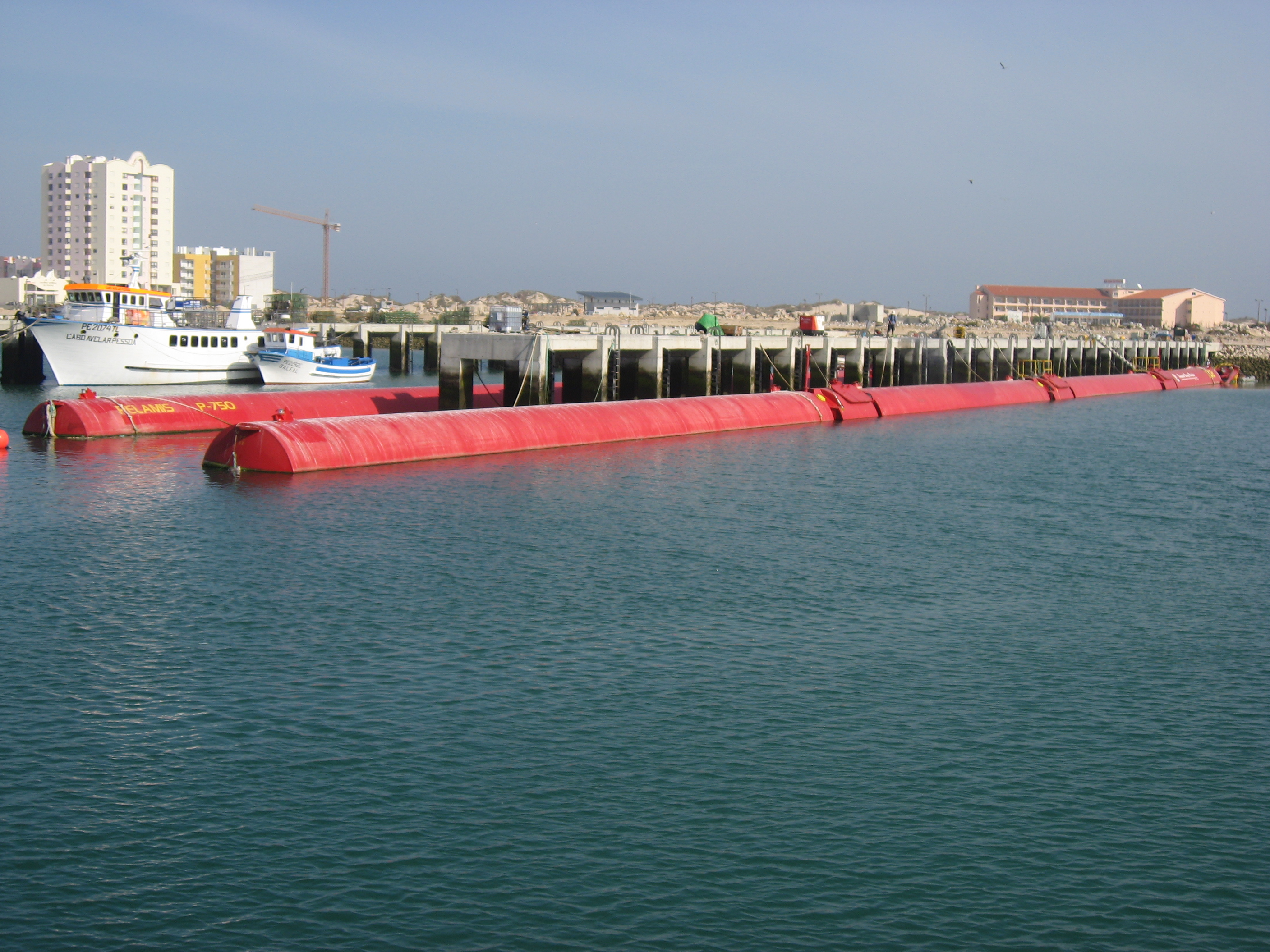
2 of 3 Pelamis machines in the harbour of Peniche, Portugal.

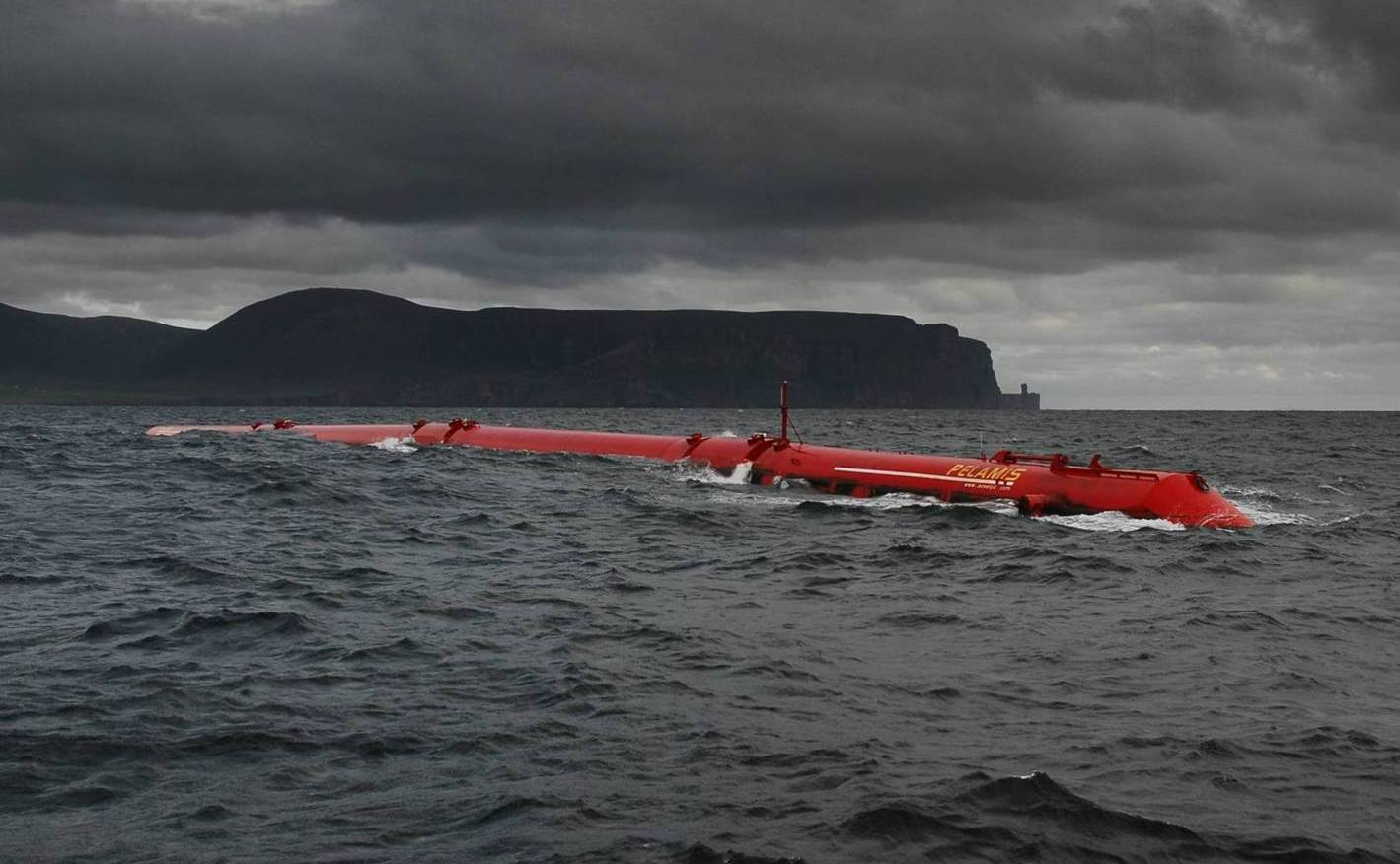
Pelamis prototype machine at EMEC.

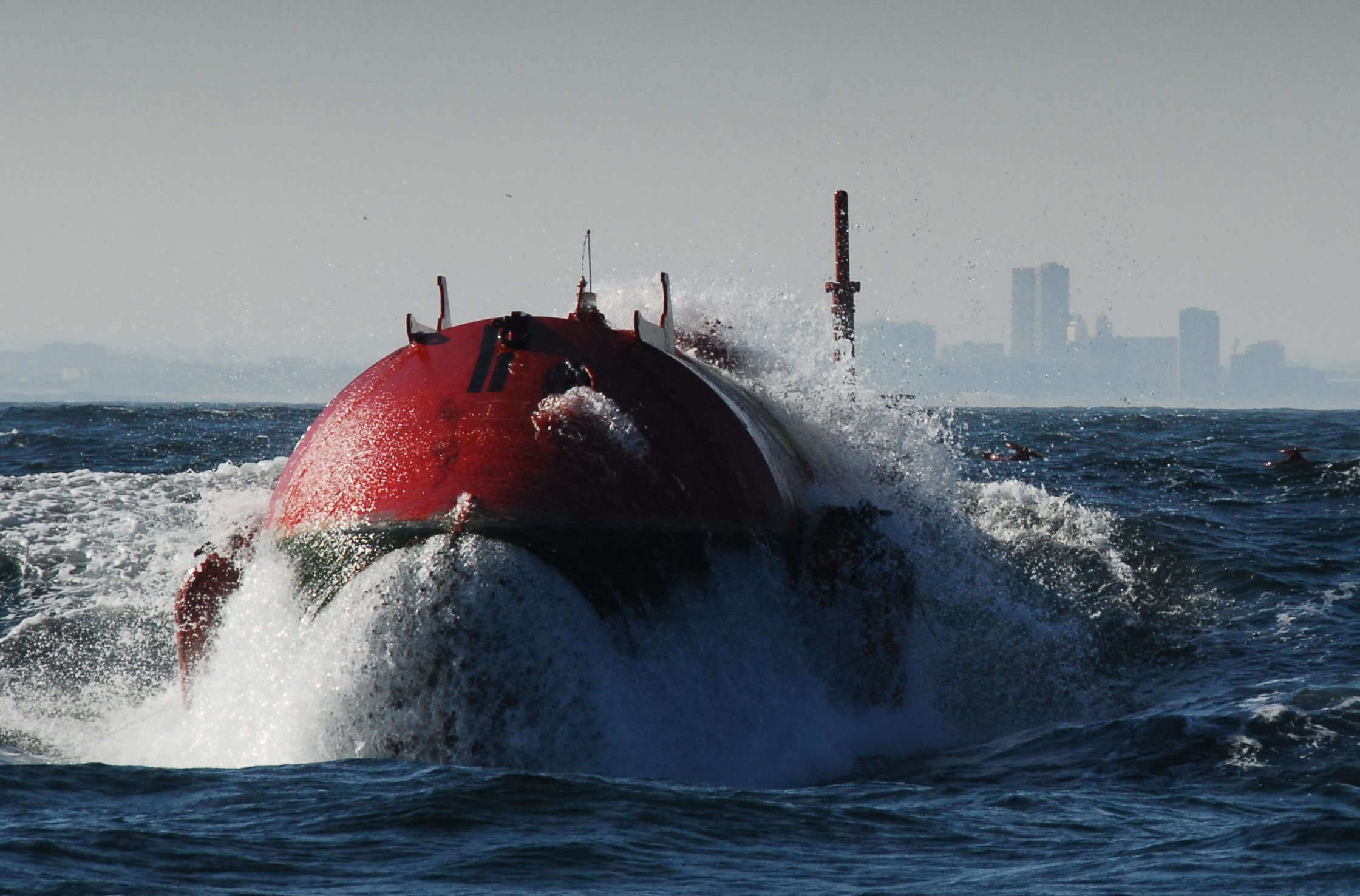
The front of the Pelamis machine bursting through a wave at the Aguçadoura Wave Park

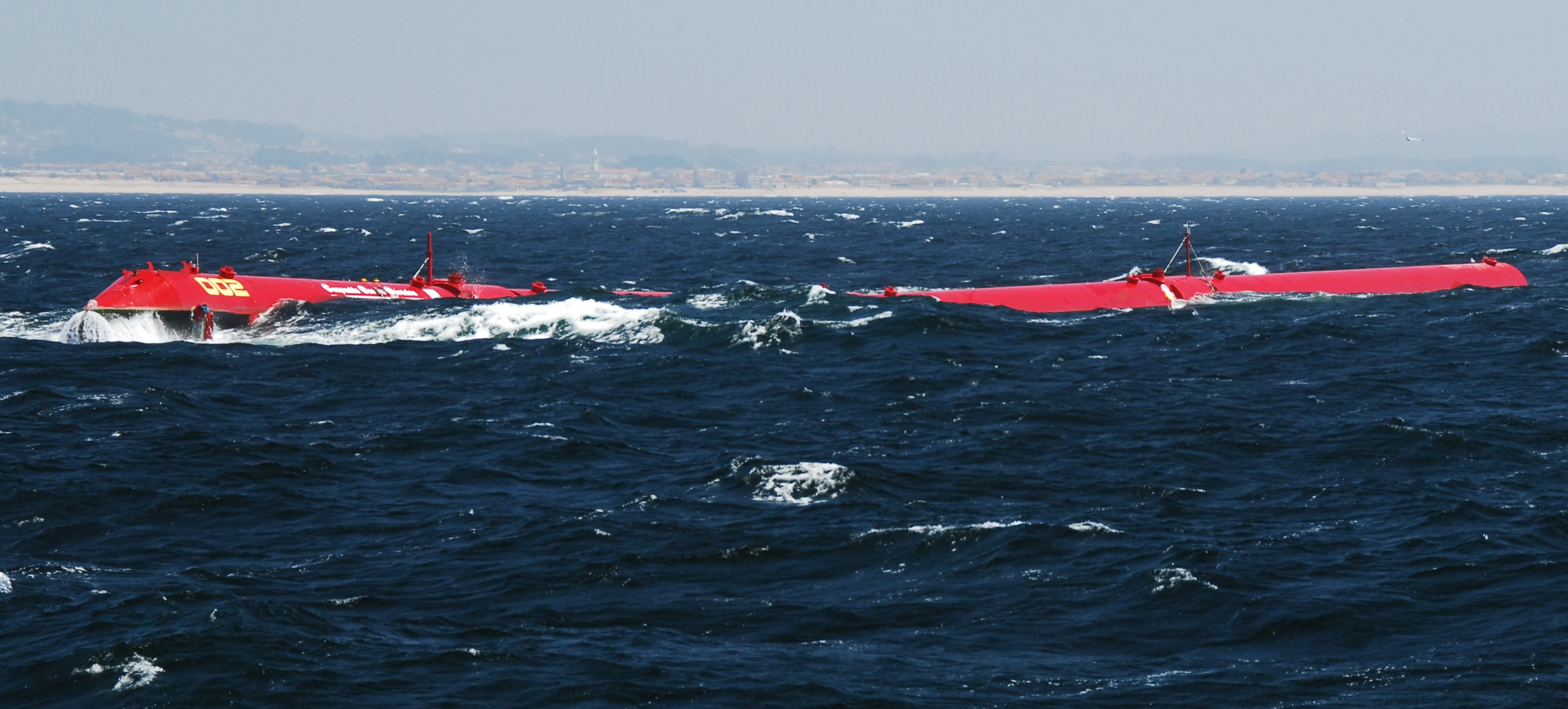
1 of 3 Pelamis machines at the Aguçadoura Wave Farm

== See also ==
- Marine current power
- Marine energy
- Wave energy
- Ocean Grazer
- Pelamis Wave Power
- Aegir wave farm
