= Pelamis Wave Power =

Scottish wave technology company

- Founded: 1998
- Defunct: November 2014
- Fate: Bankrupt
- Headquarters: Edinburgh, Scotland, United Kingdom
- Key people: Richard Yemm (CEO and Founder)
- Products: Wave energy converters
- Website: Harmful link

Pelamis Wave Power designed and manufactured the Pelamis Wave Energy Converter – a technology that uses the motion of ocean surface waves to create electricity. The company was established in 1998 and had offices and fabrication facilities in Leith Docks, Edinburgh, Scotland. It went into administration in November 2014.

== History ==
The company was founded in 1998 by Richard Yemm, Chris Retzler and David Pizer with the aim of commercialising the Pelamis Wave Energy Converter. Originally named 'Ocean Power Delivery', the company changed its name in September 2007.

In 2004 the company installed and tested their first full-scale prototype at the European Marine Energy Centre in Orkney, Scotland, becoming the first commercial scale, offshore, wave power machine to successfully generate electricity into the national grid. A commercial order for three 750 kW machines followed this successful demonstration of the Pelamis technology, resulting in the installation of three Pelamis Wave Energy Converters in 2008, the Aguçadoura Wave Farm. Located off the northwest coast of Portugal near Póvoa de Varzim the project was funded by Portuguese utility Enersis, at the time were owned by Australian global investment company Babcock & Brown. The farm first generated electricity in July 2008 but was taken offline in November 2008 at the same time as Babcock & Brown encountered financial difficulties.

In February 2009, Pelamis Wave Power secured an order from German utility company E.ON for a new generation Pelamis Wave Energy Converter, termed the P2. The machine was installed and grid connected for the first time at EMEC in October 2010, where it was tested. An additional order for a P2 machine has been placed by Scottish Power Renewables in March 2010.

The company were involved with a joint project with Swedish utility Vattenfall to develop the Aegir wave farm off the coast of Shetland, and three 50 MW sites in the Pentland Firth area, resulting from The Crown Estate seabed leasing round in March 2010.

In May 2011, the company announced that it was to make a number of redundancies. This followed the completion of the manufacture of its second P2 machine and a move into a testing and operations phase.

On 21 November 2014 the company went into administration after being unable to secure the level of additional funding required for the further development of their technology. The company had employed more than 50 staff.

In October 2016, after a Chinese company unveiled a similar wave power product, some former employees suggested that a March 2011 break-in at Pelamis, in which four to five laptops were stolen after a visit from a Chinese delegation two months prior, may have been industrial espionage.

== Awards ==
Pelamis Wave Power has won a number of awards including:

2011

- Scottish Renewables Green Energy Awards, Outstanding Contribution, Richard Yemm
- Scottish Renewables Green Energy Awards, Best Project, E.ON for the Pelamis P2 test programme

2008

- Guardian/Library House "CleanTech 100" list. Voted seventh in the inaugural Guardian/Library House, which showcased the best in European clean technology companies.

2007

- Ocean Energy Pioneer Technology Award, Energy Ocean, Hawaii
- Ocean Energy Pioneer Company Award, Energy Ocean, Hawaii
- Best Renewable Energy Company, British Renewable Energy Awards
- Trophée de l’économie positive, HEC, Paris

2004

- Tornado Insider Top 100 Europe

2003

- Emerging Technology of the Year, Euromoney and Ernst & Young
- Innovation Award, The Carbon Trust
- Best Renewable Technology, Scottish Green Energy Awards

== See also ==
- Pelamis wave energy converter
- Renewable energy in Scotland
