= Moray West Wind Farm =

Wind farm in the North Sea

Moray West Offshore Wind Farm
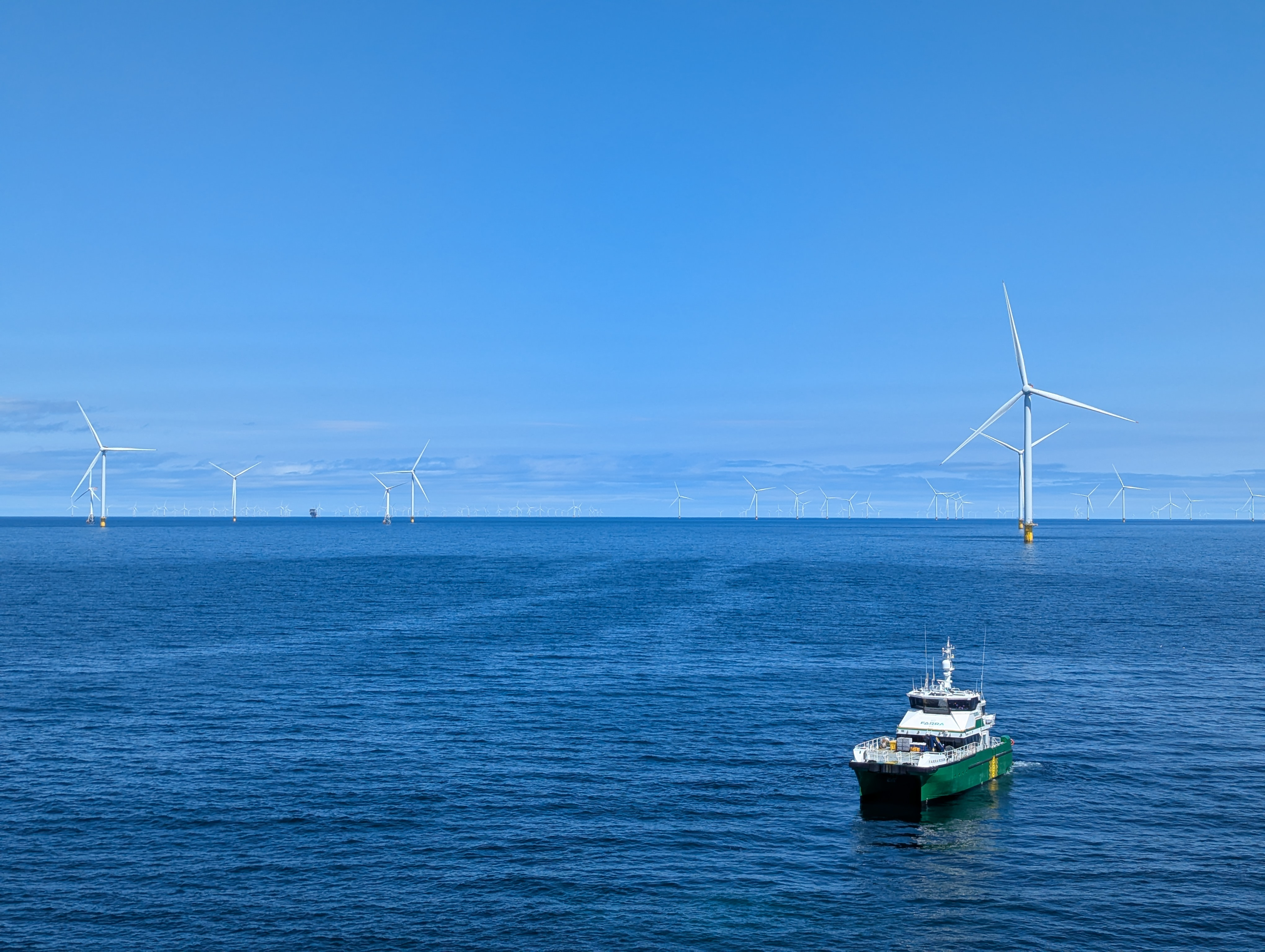
- Moray West Offshore Windfarm with crew transfer vessel in foreground
- Country: United Kingdom
- Location: Moray Firth, North Sea
- Coordinates: 58°05′38″N 2°59′17″W
- Owner: Ocean Winds

Wind farm
- Type: Offshore
- Rotor diameter: 222 m (728 ft)

Power generation
- Units operational: 60 × 14 MW
- Make and model: Siemens Gamesa SG 14-222 DD (60)
- Nameplate capacity: 882 MW

External links
- Website: www.moraywest.com

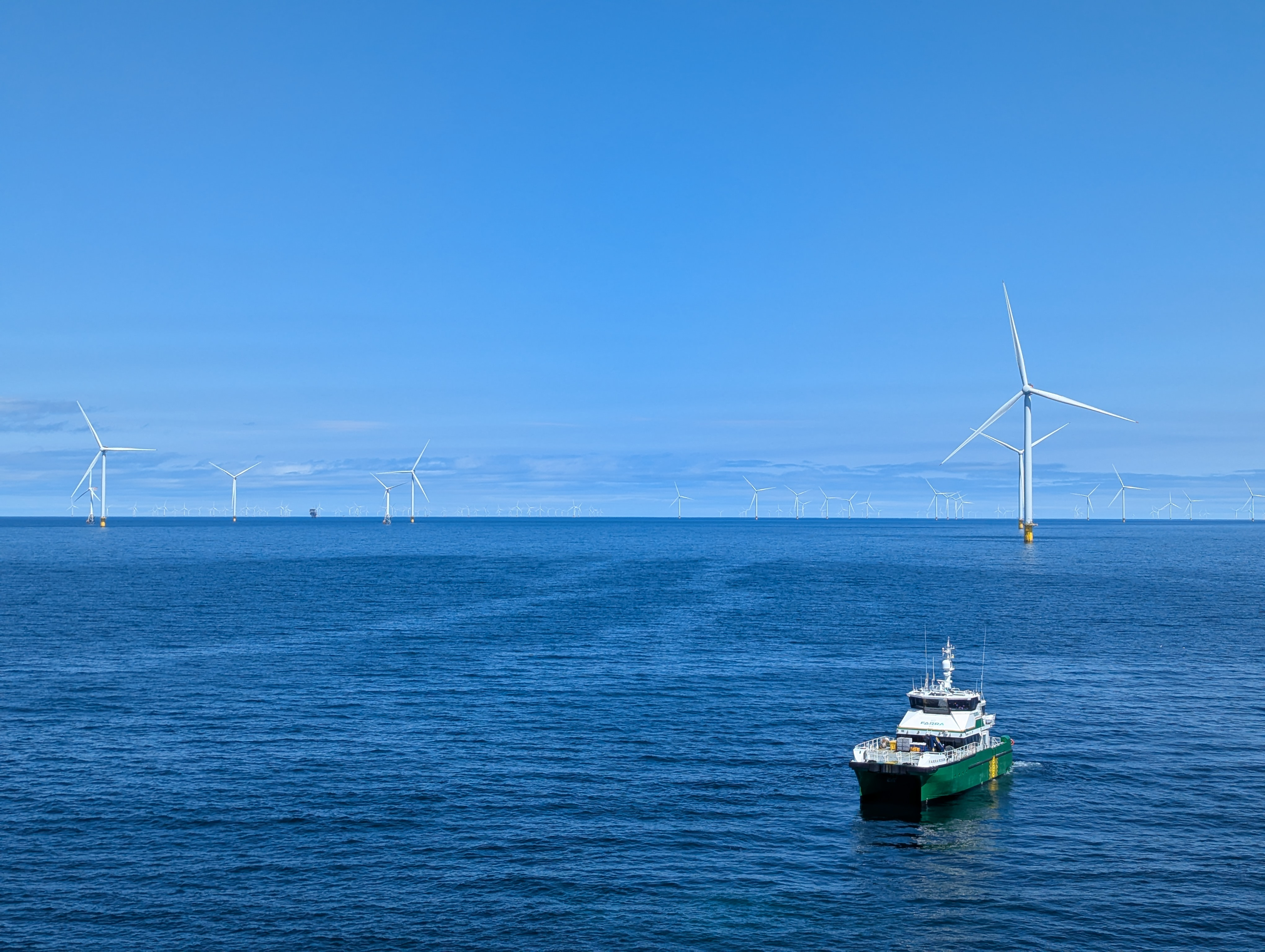
Moray West Offshore Windfarm

Wind farm layout

Moray West Wind Farm is an 882 MW offshore wind farm located in the outer Moray Firth off the coast of north-east Scotland. It is located adjacent to the Moray East Wind Farm, both of which are just south of the Beatrice Wind Farm. The wind farm is around 40 km (25 mi) north of Buckie, and 22 km (14 mi) from the coast of Caithness.

The Moray West wind farm is operated by Ocean Winds, a 50:50 joint venture between EDP Renováveis and Engie. Ocean Winds have commercial power purchase agreements with Amazon and Google, respectively for 473 MW and 100 MW of power from the wind farm.

It was consented in 2019, with first power exported in July 2024 and the farm reached full power output in April 2025.

== Technology ==
The wind farm has 60 Siemens Gamesa SG 14-222 DD turbines, each rated at 14.7 MW. The 108 m (354 ft) long blades were built in Hull. The turbines are mounted on 120 m (390 ft) tall towers and monopile foundations driven 30 m (100 ft) into the seabed.

Moray West has two offshore substations and 65 km (40 mi) of subsea power export cables. These make landfall at West Head, between Sandend and Portsoy. The original proposal to use Sandend beach was opposed by locals. A new 27 km (17 mi) underground cable transmits the power to a new substation and National Grid connection at Blackhillock Substation.

== History ==
In 2019, the project received all the required consents.

In summer and autumn 2022, offshore geophysical and geotechnical investigations plus unexploded ordnance surveys were undertaken within the wind farm site and power export cable corridor.

In July 2022, the project was awarded Contracts for Difference for 294 MW at £37.35/MWh (2012 prices) as part of Allocation Round 4. Subsequently, part of this capacity was re-bid into Allocation Round 6 at a higher price, with 73.5 MW awarded contracts at £54.23/MWh in September 2024.

=== Construction ===
The Port of Nigg was used as the marshalling facility for the construction.

The first offshore substation was installed by the Boskalis DP vessel Bokalift1 in December 2023.

In February 2024, installation of the monopile foundations started, using the DEME jack-up vessel Orion.

The first turbine was installed in April 2024.

In July 2024, the wind farm was connected to the grid, by which point all of the foundations and nearly a third of the turbines had been installed.

On 24 April 2025, the wind farm was officially switched on by Ian Murray the Scottish Secretary.
