= Shetland HVDC Connection =

Submarine power cable in Scotland

- Map of Shetland HVDC Connection

Location
- Country: Scotland, United Kingdom
- From: Upper Kergord Valley, Shetland
- Passes through: North Sea
- To: Caithness HVDC switching station, near Wick

Ownership information
- Operator: Scottish Hydro Electric Transmission

Construction information
- Commissioned: August 2024

Technical information
- Type: Submarine cable
- Current type: HVDC
- Total length: 260 km (160 mi)
- Capacity: 600 MW
- DC voltage: +/-320 kV
- No. of poles: 2 (Symmetrical monopole)
- No. of circuits: 1

The Shetland HVDC Connection is a high-voltage direct current submarine power cable connecting Shetland to the British mainland and the National Grid. It was first proposed in 2007, although it took until 2022 for construction to commence.

It is part of a multi-terminal link, connecting Kergord in Shetland to Spittal in Caithness and Blackhillock in Moray via a switching station at Noss Head near Wick in Caithness. The southern part of this is the Caithness - Moray Link.

== History ==
The project was proposed in 2007. In January 2008, the report published by the Crown Estate found the project would be "economically and technically possible". At the same year, Scottish Hydro Electric Transmission filed planning application and started public consultations.

Originally, the cable was planned to run from Shetland to 320 km (200 miles) to Portgordon on the Scottish mainland, and then on to Blackhillock substation, near Keith, Moray via 25 km (16-mile) underground cable. However, the end point was moved to Caithness, and the remaining part of the connection was constructed separately as the Caithness - Moray Link.

In 2019, Ofgem announced that it was minded to authorise construction, subject to the Viking windfarm winning a CfD contract in the government auction held in September 2019. Viking Energy was unsuccessful in this auction, putting the future of the interconnector in doubt.

SSEN submitted a revised proposal in January 2020. Ofgem carried out a final consultation on this revised proposal, and concluded in April 2020 that it would grant conditional approval for the link, conditional on Ofgem receiving sufficient evidence by the end of 2020 that the 457 MW Viking Wind Farm project is likely to go ahead.

In April 2020, Ofgem approved revised proposals for the project, subject to "evidence that the Shetland Viking Wind Farm project will go ahead". On 17 June 2020, the Viking Wind Farm sponsor, SSE Renewables, made a final investment decision to proceed with the wind farm investment, conditional on certain industry code modifications, and "the outcome of the consultation on Ofgem’s minded-to position to approve the transmission link, expected in July 2020". According to Shetland News, this meant that both the Windfarm and the HVDC Connection were "likely to go ahead". On 16 July 2020, Ofgem gave final approval for the connection.

Contracts for construction were awarded in August 2020 to Hitachi and BAM Nuttall. In February 2022, Hitachi Energy started the process of installing HVDC equipment at Kergord. Installation of the subsea cable started in July 2022.

In April 2022, the project was described as "on track to be completed by 2024". The subsea cable installation is ongoing, and expected to continue until 2023. The first transmission of energy happened in June 2024, and the connection was commissioned in August of the same year.

== Route ==
The interconnector starts at the Upper Kergord Valley converter station in Shetland. From the converter station an underground cable runs to a landing area in Weisdale Voe. From there, a subsea cable runs to landfall at Noss Head in Caithness, with onward connection to an HVDC switching station north of the village of Staxigoe in Caithness.

The route of the cable crosses TAT-10, TAT-14 and Atlantic Crossing 1 telecommunication cables and the Piper–Flotta oil pipeline.

== Technical description ==
The interconnector connects to the existing 320 kV Caithness - Moray Link to form a three terminal HVDC network, with converter stations at Spittal in Caithness; Blackhillock Substation in Moray; and Upper Kergord on Shetland. The Shetland leg has a power rating of 600 MW; the Spittal and Blackhillock converters are rated at 800 MW and 1,200 MW respectively. This was the first multi-terminal HVDC interconnection installed in Europe, and the second in the world, after one in China.

== Project developer ==
The project is being developed by Scottish Hydro Electric Transmission, a subsidiary of SSE plc.

== Project economics ==
It is estimated that it will cost more than £600 million. Another source stated cost of £660 million.

The project is needed for development of Shetland's renewable energy potential and it is necessary for the projects such as the Viking Wind Farm.

It also contributes to the security of Shetland's electricity supply, especially as Lerwick Power Station is nearing the end of its operational life.

== See also ==
- Caithness - Moray Link, the other arm of the 3-way HVDC network.
- Western Isles HVDC connection
