= Lerwick Power Station =

Power station in Shetland, Scotland

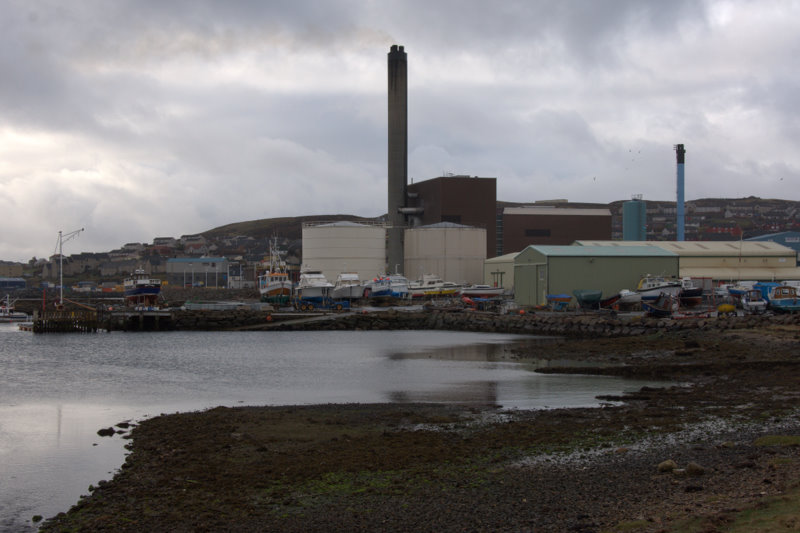
- Lerwick Power Station in 2010
- Country: Scotland, United Kingdom
- Location: Gremista, Lerwick, Shetland
- Coordinates: 60.1670°N 1.1646°W
- Status: Operational
- Commission date: 27 May 1953
- Operator: Scottish and Southern Energy

Thermal power station
- Primary fuel: Diesel fuel

Power generation
- Units operational: 6 x 6 MW; 2 x 8 MW; 1 x 12 MW; 2.1 MW
- Make and model: Mirrlees, Bickerton & Day diesel generators Pielstick engines Wärtsilä engine
- Nameplate capacity: 66 MW

External links
- Commons: Related media on Commons

The main power supply for Shetland is provided by Lerwick Power Station, located in Gremista, 2 kilometres (1.2 mi) northwest of Lerwick town centre. This is the principal source of electrical energy for Shetland. However, as of 2015, about 20 MWe is provided by the Sullom Voe Terminal power station which comprises 4 x 23 MWe Gas Turbines, the future of which is uncertain.

Opened on 27 May 1953, the station is fueled with diesel and generates 66 MW of power.

== Equipment ==
Originally the facility had six 6 MWe Mirrlees diesel generator K Major sets (some of which have been decommissioned); two 8 MWe French Pielstick engines were added in 1983 and a further Finnish 12 MWe Wärtsilä (originally a Stork Werkspoor design) engine was commissioned in 1994. A waste-heat recovery system applied to the exhaust of the Wartsila only produces super-heated steam which runs a 2.1 MW WH Allen turbine, thus making this set a combined cycle. Two standby gas turbine generator units, each with a capacity of 5 MW, were installed in containers outside the existing buildings to augment peak output. A 6 MWe Wärtsilä 32 (12V32) was installed in 2020 with further engines currently in the process of being installed, these engines are to eventually replace the 6 Mirrlees K-Major Engines. The plant is operated by Scottish and Southern Energy (SSE), which also runs the islands' 33kV and 11kV grids.

== Load balancing ==
The growth of output from wind turbines in Shetland has increased instability in the local grid (which is not synchronised to the national grid on mainland Scotland). The 440 MW Viking Wind Farm started in 2024.

SSE installed a 1 MW sodium–sulfur battery in a nearby building to ameliorate the peak loads; however, due to safety concerns, the sodium-sulfur battery was removed prior to commissioning and the energy storage building was reconfigured to accommodate 3 MWh of advanced lead-acid batteries in 2016. A 68 MW lithium grid battery is scheduled to provide grid stability by 2026.

== Replacement plan ==
There are proposals to replace the power station at a new greenfield site north of the existing one. Planning permission has been granted for the development; however, the decision to proceed has been delayed by the proposed Shetland HVDC Connection, which, depending on how it is implemented, may make such a station redundant, or only required as standby, which would affect the type of plant chosen. The 600 MW cable to Scotland was commissioned in August 2024.

== Lerwick District Heating ==
There is an adjacent, but distinct, district heating network. See Lerwick District Heating and Energy Recovery Plant. Recovered heat from the cooling water of the most recently installed Wartsilla engine has been supplied to the district heating since its commissioning in 2021.
