= Verdant Power =

Maker and installer of tidal power and hydroelectric systems

Verdant Power, Inc.
- Industry: Tidal Power Systems
- Founded: 2000; 26 years ago
- Headquarters: New York, NY, USA
- Website: www.verdantpower.com

Verdant Power, Inc is a maker and installer of tidal power and hydroelectric systems. Their primary device is an underwater turbine, similar to a three-bladed wind turbine, that is designed to capture energy from tidal currents and (precipitation-driven) river currents. The company uses the trade term "kinetic hydropower" to distinguish their systems from those (tidal and hydroelectric) based on dam construction. The company's first project, the Roosevelt Island Tidal Energy Project, is several turbines in New York City's East River.

== Location ==
Verdant's home base is situated between Manhattan and Queens on Roosevelt Island in the middle of the East River, a tidal strait running from Long Island Sound to Upper New York Bay.

== RITE Project ==
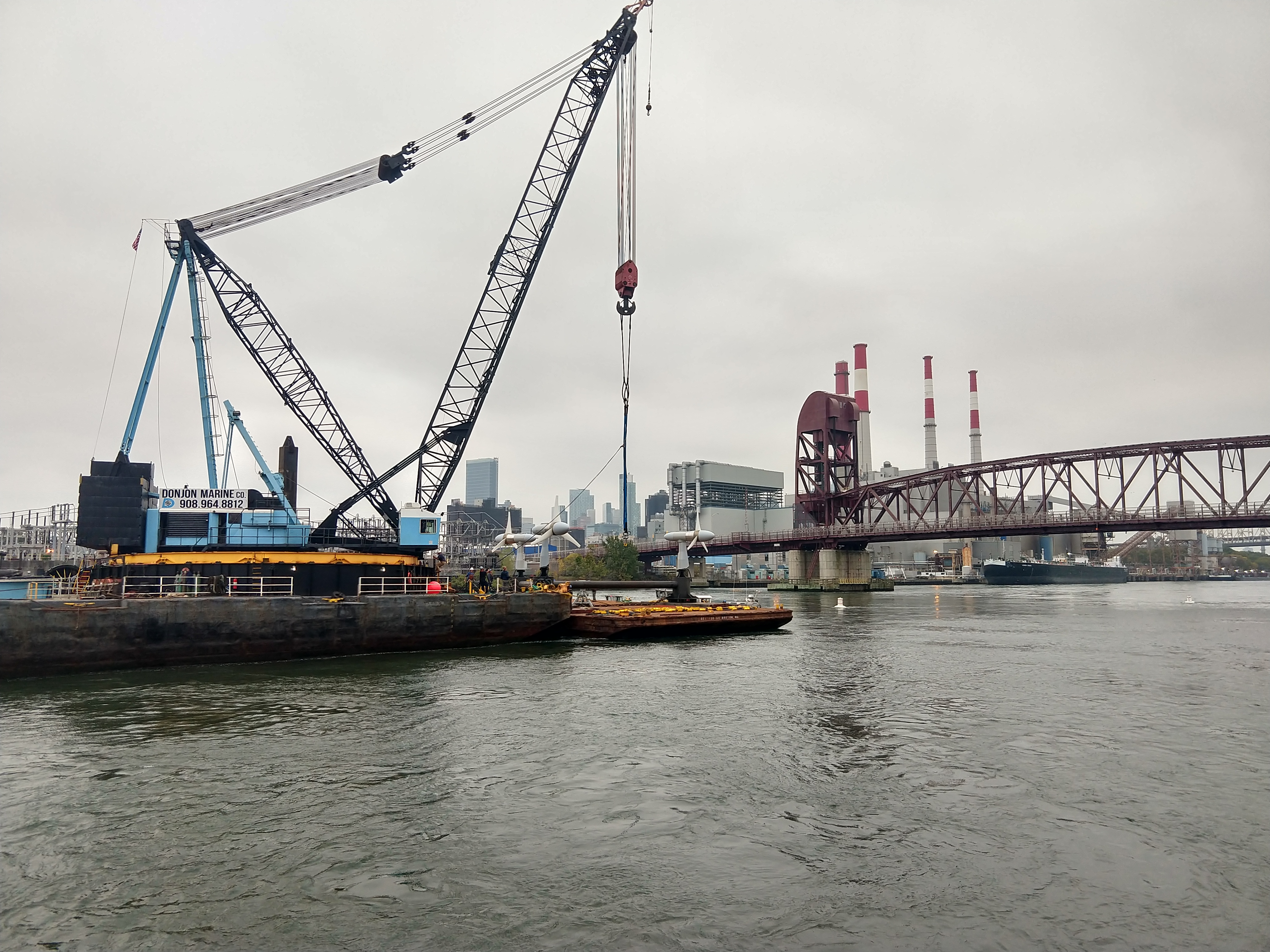
Installation of three Verdant Power 35kW turbines on a tri-frame base, on 22 October 2020

The Roosevelt Island Tidal Energy (RITE) Project, owned by Verdant Power, is the first tidal energy project to be issued a license from the Federal Energy Regulatory Commission (FERC). The project is located to the east of Roosevelt Island in the East River, with the southernmost turbine approximately 100 metres (330 ft) north of the Roosevelt Island Bridge.

The first of three phases of the project was prototype testing from 2002 until 2006 when the phase 2 demonstration began. The first two prototypes were installed in late 2006 and early in 2007, although these were not fully successful.

In May 2007, six full-scale tidal turbines were installed on the river bed, in three rows approximately 100 feet (30 m) apart, five of which were fitted with a 35 kW generator. This constituted the "world's first operation of a grid-connected tidal turbine array". They provided power for a Gristedes supermarket and the adjacent Motorgate parking garage on Roosevelt Island. This test concluded in October 2008, having generated around 50 MWh of electricity.

In February 2012 the federal government announced an agreement with Verdant Power to install 30 tidal turbines in the channel, then projected to begin operations in 2015 and produce 1.05 MW of power. There were problems with turbine blade degradation. A September 2012 test of a newly designed 16-feet diameter turbine was a success, and the company estimated it will take about 5 years to complete the array of 30 turbines in the river. In August 2013, CBS News reported that Verdant planned to put "two more turbines in the river over the next year or two and build up from there".

A "TriFrame" platform with three 70 kW fifth generation (Gen5) turbines was installed in October 2020, providing power to Con Edison's local grid. After six months, one of the turbines was replaced with a new Gen5 turbine with thermoplastic blades developed by NREL. EMEC conducted an assessment of the turbines following the relevant International Electrotechnical Commission standard, "62600-200: Electricity producing tidal energy converters – power performance assessment".

== Morlais project ==
In a joint venture between with Duggan Energy, named Verdant Isles, there are plans to deploy grid-connected turbines at the Morlais site in northwest Wales. Verdant Isles was awarded a Contracts for Difference in September 2023 to supply electricity to the GB grid, which will form phase one of the project, with 4.9 MW to be commissioned by 2027/28.
