= Morlais =

Tidal stream power station under construction in Wales

- Country: Wales
- Location: Holy Island, Anglesey
- Coordinates: 53°18′23″N 4°43′00″W
- Status: Under construction
- Construction began: 2022
- Owner: Menter Môn
- Operator: Menter Môn

Tidal power station
- Type: Tidal stream generator
- Crosses: Irish Sea

Power generation
- Units operational: None as yet
- Nameplate capacity: 240 MW (potential)

External links
- Website: https://morlaisenergy.com

Morlais is a grid connected tidal stream energy project located in the Irish Sea just off the west coast of Holy Island, Anglesey, Wales (Welsh: Ynys Cybi, Ynys Môn, Cymru). It is being developed by the social enterprise agency Menter Môn. The site has the potential for up to 240 MW of renewable energy to be harnessed from the tides, using a mixture of seabed mounted and floating tidal energy devices from different companies.

The 35 km^{2} (14 sq mi) site was designated for tidal energy by The Crown Estate in 2010, as the West Anglesey Demonstration Zone, and has been leased for 45 years. Consent for the scheme was obtained in December 2021 from Natural Resources Wales. The scheme was awarded £31m from the European Regional Development Fund in March 2022, possibly the last significant project from this fund. Following this, construction started in 2022, with phased installation so that any environmental impacts could be understood.

The first devices to harvest power from the tides are expected to be installed in 2026. Before then, preparatory works including the grid connection are being constructed. Mark Drakeford officially opened the onshore substation in October 2023, noting that "Morlais is a groundbreaking project and a key part of our transition to a low carbon economy". In February 2025, it was announced the Welsh Government had invested £8 million for an equity stake in the project. These funds will be used to improve the grid capacity at Parc Cybi, Holyhead.

RSPB Cymru expressed concerns about the scheme's potential impacts on wildlife, including guillemots and razorbills. An environmental impact assessment was completed, with detailed independent studies on various aspects of the project construction, operation, and decommissioning. Environmental surveys are still ongoing, with a monitoring buoy equipped with cameras and other sensors deployed in July 2023, as part of the Marine Characterisation Research Project.

== Site description and environmental conditions ==
The project, as set out in the Environmental Statement will comprise the following elements:

- Navigation and environmental monitoring equipment
- Tidal devices with associated moorings and foundations
- Array cables and other offshore electrical infrastructure
- Up to nine export cables with associated cable landfall
- Onshore landfall substation at Ty-Mawr
- Switchgear building at Parc Cybi
- Grid connection substation at Orthios Eco-Park, southeast of Holyhead, where it connects to the 132 kV National Grid.
- Cable corridor between the landfall substation via the switchgear building to the grid connection substation.

The onshore grid connection work was completed by civil engineering firm Jones Bros in June 2023, three months ahead of schedule. Work to upgrade the grid connection from 18 MW to 240 MW commenced in July 2025, this is also being undertaken by Jones Bros. The £16m Cydnerth project (Welsh for resilience) will connect the Morlais substation at Ynys Lawd (South Stack) to the National Grid at Parc Cybi.

The tidal site covers an area of approximately 35 km^{2}, situated between approximately 0.5 km and 6 km offshore. The water depth across the site is around 40 m on average, reaching 72 m LAT to the northwest of the site. The site can be classified as an isolated/quiet environment, with a mixture of soft and hard bottom.

Modelling of the area around the site shows mean depth-averaged velocities of 1.7 m/s (3.3 knots) and peaks of 3.7 m/s (7.2 knots). Across most of the site, ebb and flood tides are misaligned by 0° to 15°, which may have a small impact on turbine performance.

In September 2024, the Environmental Monitoring and Mitigation Plan (EMMP) for the site was approved by Natural Resources Wales, discharging one of the planning conditions. The EMMP was developed by Menter Môn, together with environmental stakeholders, within the Marine Characterisation Research Project (MCRP). Environmental baseline data collected within the MCRP will be made available through the Crown Estate’s Marine Data Exchange platform.

== Planned devices and developers ==
The site is split into multiple berths. Several developers have announced plans to deploy devices and have been awarded Contracts for Difference (CfD) in Allocation Rounds AR4, AR5 and AR6 to supply power to the GB grid at a guaranteed price, at a specified future delivery year.

=== Hydrowing ===
Hydrowing, part of Inyanga Marine Energy Group, plan to deploy an initial phase of around 10 MW, using the next-generation Tocardo T3 turbines, mounted on a multi-rotor frame that has a wing-like structure. The first phase is for 14 units each with two turbines rated at 340 kW, a total of 9.52 MW. Hydrowing Tidal Projects Ltd. was awarded a CfD for 10 MW in the CfD AR5 in September 2023, for delivery in 2027/28. Hydrowing was awarded a further 10 MW in the CfD AR6 in September 2024, also for delivery in 2027/28. In May 2025, Hydrowing awarded the fabrication contract to build its tidal energy device to Hutchinson Engineering. The frame will be part-constructed at Hutchinson's Cheshire factory with final construction to take place in Wales in early 2026.

=== Magallanes Renovables ===
Spanish developer Magallanes Renovables secured CfDs in both AR4 and AR5, for 5.62 MW by 2025/26 and 3 MW by 2027/28 respectively. They plan to deploy their next-generation floating ATIR devices at berth GR3.

=== Môr Energy ===
The Welsh subsidiary of QED-Naval, was awarded a CfD for 4.5 MW by 2026/27 in the CfD AR5 in September 2023. They plan to deploy at berth GO3.

=== Verdant Isles ===
A joint venture between Verdant Power and Duggan Energy, Verdant Isles plan to deploy an initial phase one of 4.9 MW by 2027/28 at berth BL3. Verdant Isles was awarded a CfD for 4.9 MW in CfD AR5 in September 2023. The Verdant Power device is a three-bladed horizontal axis tidal turbine that sits on a triangular frame on the seabed, previously tested in New York’s East River.

In June 2024, Inyanga and Verdant Morlais announced they would collaborate in their projects at Morlais, to help unlock economies of scale and potentially reduce costs.

== Other potential devices and developers ==
Several other developers have announced tentative plans to deploy at Morlais, however these have more uncertainty.

=== Nova Innovation and Sabella ===
Joint plans were announced in January 2022 by Edinburgh-based Nova Innovation and Quimper-based Sabella to each develop 6 MW of a 12 MW berth at Morlais. The first deployments were initially stated for 2023/24, but there have been no further announcements on this.

=== Orbital Marine Power ===
Orbital announced in 2018 that they planned to deploy their floating 2 MW Orbital O2 turbines at Morlais. However, there has been no news on this project since.

=== Minesto ===
Swedish tidal kite developer Minesto tested a 500 kW prototype in the Holyhead Deep, just to the west of Morlais in 2018 and 2019. They also had plans to develop an 80 MW array at this location, but withdrew from the project in March 2022 to focus on their projects in the Faroe Islands.

== See also ==
- Renewable energy in Wales
- List of tidal power stations
