= Moray East Wind Farm =

Wind farm in Scotland

Moray East Offshore Wind Farm
- Fraserburgh Harbour, the location of the wind farm operations centre
- Country: United Kingdom
- Location: Moray Firth, North Sea
- Coordinates: 58°10′01″N 2°41′55″W
- Commission date: 2022
- Owners: KEPCO; Mitsubishi Corporation; Ocean Winds

Wind farm
- Type: Offshore
- Rotor diameter: 164 m (538 ft)

Power generation
- Units operational: 100 × 9.5 MW
- Make and model: MHI Vestas V164-9.5MW (100)
- Nameplate capacity: 950 MW

External links
- Website: www.morayeast.com

Wind farm layout

Moray East Wind Farm is an offshore wind farm located in the outer Moray Firth off the coast of Scotland. It is located adjacent to the Moray West Wind Farm, both of which are just south of the Beatrice Wind Farm. The wind farm is around 50 km (30 mi) north of the Moray coast, and 22 km (14 mi) from the coast of Caithness.

The wind farm was consented in 2014, originally as three windfarms named Telford, Stevenson and MacColl. Construction began in 2019, first power was exported in June 2021, and the farm reached full power output in April 2022.

== Technology ==
The wind farm includes 100 Vestas V164-9.5 MW turbines for a total generating capacity of 950 MW. These have a 164 m (538 ft) diameter rotor, with a hub height of 105 m (344 ft) and a tip height of 187 m (614 ft). Each turbine is mounted on a three-legged jacket foundation.

The wind farm includes three offshore substations and uses three 220 kV AC export cables to transmit generated power to the national grid, connected via a new substation at New Deer. The cable landfall location is at Inverboyndie bay, west of Banff, Aberdeenshire, and the cables were pulled through ducts which extend 1 km (0.6 mi) offshore to minimise environmental impacts. The export cables are 86 km (53 mi) long, with 52 km (32 mi) offshore and 34 km (21 mi) onshore. The array cables for the wind farm are 66 kV.

The operations and maintenance (O&M) base for the wind farm is located in Fraserburgh Harbour. This includes an O&M building—with control room, offices, and workshops—plus berthing facilities and storage areas.

== History ==
=== Development ===
The project was developed by Moray Offshore Renewables Ltd (MORL), originally as three windfarms named Telford, Stevenson and MacColl. Up to 62 turbines were proposed for each project with a rotor diameter of 150–172 m (492–564 ft).

In March 2013, the wind farms received planning consent from the Highland Council and Scottish Government, along with the neighbouring Beatrice Wind Farm. Consent for the construction and operation of the windfarms under "Section 36" of the Electricity Act was granted on 19 March 2014.

In December 2017, an application was made to vary the "Section 36" consents, increasing the maximum turbine power to 10 MW from the 6–8 MW considered in the Environmental Impact Assessment, without increasing the size of the turbines. This was approved by the Scottish Government on 22 March 2018.

A met-mast was installed to measure the wind conditions at the site in September 2014. The lattice tower was fabricated in Invergordon by Isleburn, a Global Energy subsidiary.

In September 2017, the windfarm received market support under the Contracts for Difference (CfD) scheme Allocation Round 2, to deliver electricity at £57.50/MWh (2012 prices).

In December 2018, contracts to Siemens, Vestas, and Boskalis were announced. Boskalis would install the inter-array cabling.

=== Construction ===
In 2019, Construction of the wind farm commenced, with DEME Offshore installing pin-piles for the tripod jacket foundations using their jack-up vessel Apollo. The foundations were installed by the jack-up vessel Seajacks Scylla between July and December 2020.

The first turbine was installed in January 2021 by the Fred. Olsen jack-up vessel Bold Tern. When the 64th turbine was installed in July, the project became Scotland's largest offshore wind farm. The final turbine was installed in September 2021.

The wind farm began exporting power in June 2021.

In September 2021, the operations base in Fraserburgh was officially opened by Michael Matheson, at the time the Scottish Government Cabinet secretary for net zero and energy.

Full power output was achieved in April 2022, and was commissioned. However, as market prices had increased above the CfD price due to the 2021 United Kingdom natural gas supplier crisis, the operator deferred the CfD start.

== Constraint payment investigation ==
In April 2025, Ofgem launched an inquiry looking at whether Ocean Winds had claimed excessive prices to reduce output at times of network constraints. The Renewable Energy Foundation had previously alleged widespread overcharging by operators of wind farms, and stated the Moray East wind farm was paid £100m in the two-year period ending in September 2023.

== See also ==
- Moray West Wind Farm
