= Caithness - Moray Link =

Undersea HVDC power transmission cable in Scotland

Caithness–Moray Link
- Map of Caithness–Moray Link

Location
- Country: United Kingdom
- From: Spittal substation, Caithness
- Passes through: Moray Firth
- To: Blackhillock Substation, Moray

Ownership information
- Operator: Scottish & Southern Electricity Networks

Construction information
- Cable installer: NKT
- Substation installer: ABB
- Construction cost: £970 million
- Commissioned: January 2019

Technical information
- Type: submarine cable
- Current type: HVDC
- Total length: 160 km (99 mi)
- Capacity: 1,200 MW
- DC voltage: 320 kV
- No. of poles: 2
- No. of circuits: 1

The Caithness–Moray Link is a 160 km (100-mile) HVDC submarine power cable beneath the Moray Firth in Scotland, linking Spittal in Caithness and Blackhillock in Moray. Constructed by Scottish & Southern Electricity Networks, it is capable of transmitting up to 1,200 MW of power. It was officially completed in January 2019, under budget at a cost of £970 million, and was reported as the largest single investment in the northern Scottish electricity network since the 1950s.

The link was constructed to improve the connectivity of the Scottish electricity transmission network, and allow increased flow of electricity from renewable energy sources in the north of Scotland, such as the Dorenell wind farm. It also connects into the Shetland HVDC Connection, as part of a multi-terminal link.

It was the second HVDC link to be constructed within the National Grid (as opposed to as an interconnector), (Note: In modern times. HVDC Kingsnorth, since decommissioned, was the first internal HVDC link.) after the Western HVDC Link.

== Construction ==
The route was originally intended to form part of the Shetland HVDC Connection, however the project was split into two parts, with the Caithness - Moray link to be constructed first at a projected cost of £1.2 billion.

The Caithness–Moray link was approved by regulators in 2014, with the contract for laying the undersea cable awarded to NKT. 113 km (70 miles) of the link runs beneath the sea, with a total of 48 km (30 miles) of underground cross-linked polyethylene cable at both ends.

The project required the construction of two new HVDC converter stations, at Spittal and Blackhillock, with the construction contract for these awarded to ABB. After the addition of the converter station, Blackhillock Substation became the largest in the UK, at the size of 24 football pitches.

The wider project also involved the augmentation of other parts of the power transmission network in northern Scotland, with upgrades carried out on a total of eight substations and two overhead transmission lines.

The Shetland HVDC Connection was constructed between 2022 and 2024, with a switching station added at Noss Head near Wick in Caithness. This became the first multi-terminal HVDC interconnection installed in Europe, and the second in the world, after one in China.
