= Western Isles HVDC connection =

HVDC transmission line in Scotland, the United Kingdom

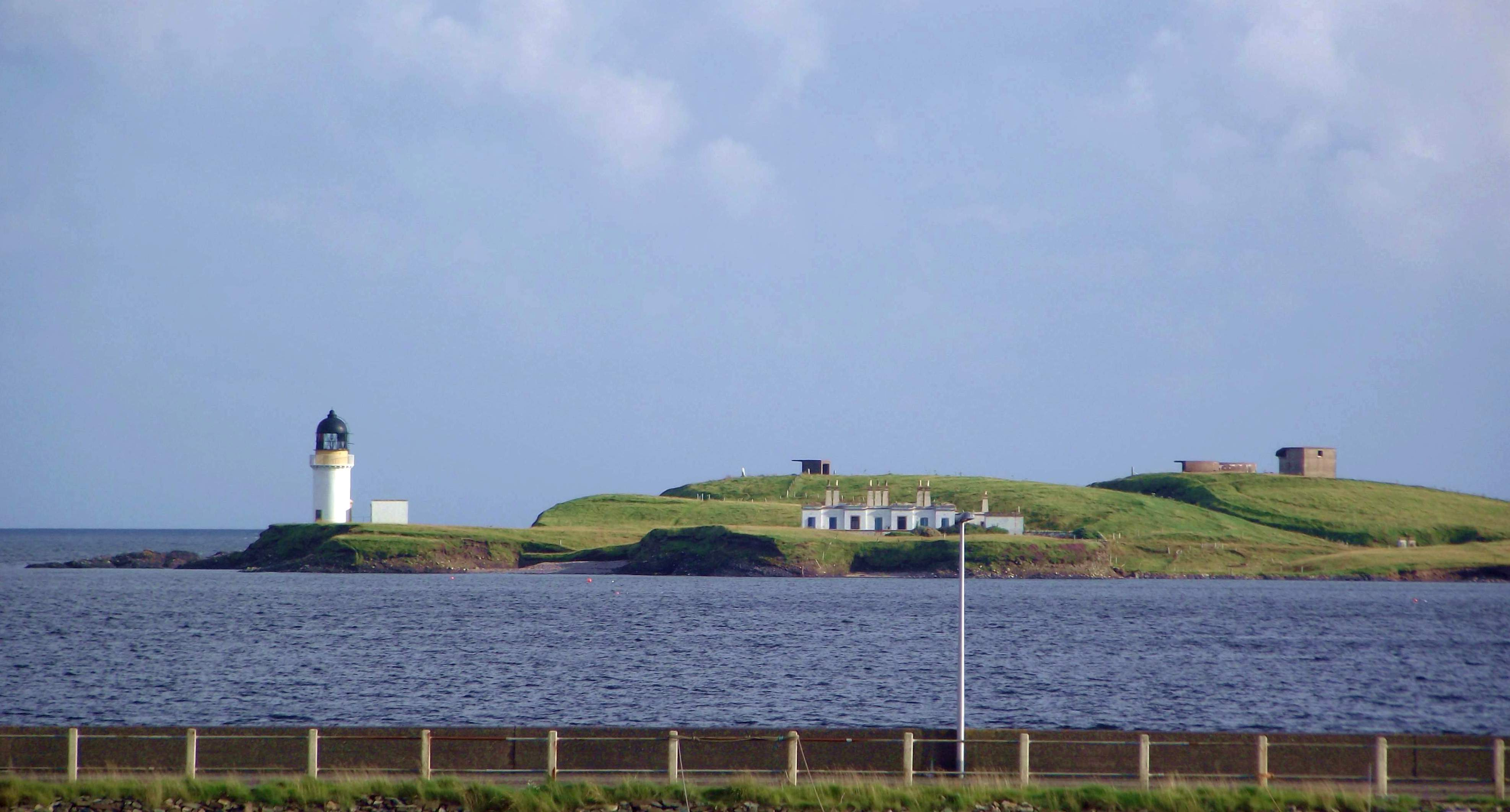
The Arnish peninsula in Stornoway harbour, where the cable will terminate on Lewis

The head of Little Loch Broom, where the cable will come ashore on the mainland

The Western Isles HVDC connection is a proposed 1.8GW HVDC submarine power cable to connect the Isle of Lewis to the Scottish mainland.

The project promoter, Scottish and Southern Electricity Networks, identifies the link as "one of the key investments across GB that is required to meet 2030 offshore wind targets, [and] marks a major step forward in unlocking the renewable energy potential of the Western Isles".

== Route ==
The cable would connect Arnish, near Stornoway in Lewis to the National Grid at the Beauly substation.

The island converter station and grid connection substation will be at Arnish Point in Lewis. From there, the marine cable will pass through ducts directly into the sea at 22m depth. 81km of subsea cable will carry the current to Dundonnell at the head of Little Loch Broom in Wester Ross. Around 75km of underground cable will carry HVDC to the converter station, which will have an 6km underground AC connection to the mainland transmission system at Beauly. (The reference contains a detailed map of the marine route.)

== Current status ==
In December 2022, the Western Isles HVDC connection received approval from Ofgem.

As of August 2022, the project was in the early stage of development.

In June 2022, when a 600MW link was being proposed, construction was planned from Summer 2024 to Summer 2026, with commissioning completed and connection in Spring 2027.

In July 2022, the increase of planned capacity to 1.8GW set the proposed completion date back three years to 2030, though SSEN is exploring options to bring this forward again.

== Technical specification ==
The latest proposal for the link calls for a 1.8GW connection, which would provide sufficient capacity for all planned onshore and offshore wind projects around the Western Isles, with some spare capacity for future renewable generation projects.

== Project history ==
Initial planning for the link had started before 2008.

In 2010, a needs case was submitted to Ofgem, but was subsequently withdrawn.

In 2013, a needs case was sent back by Ofgem within a month, querying why it was being submitted at a time when generators were seeking, but had not received, enhanced CfD support.

By April 2014, the proposal was for a 450MW single circuit HVDC link. At this time, the project was locked into a cycle of regulatory uncertainty: Ofgem would not sanction a link without a confirmed need; wind farm developers could not finalise their plans without a confirmed link. According to the Scottish Government's Grid Access Study:

Scottish Hydro Electric Transmission (SHE-T), the transmission owner, is required to make a needs case to Ofgem justifying funding for the full 450MW capacity of the investment, and this has been locked in a negative feedback loop fuelled by market and cost uncertainties. Investment cases have been made, and then withdrawn or sent back when circumstances have changed. Either certainty is required to allow the needs case to go forward, or the needs case should go forward despite the uncertainty. Unless one or other changes, this negative cycle will not be broken.

In August 2018, the case for a 600MW connector was submitted to Ofgem.

In Sept 2019, the proposed Stornoway Wind Farm in Lewis failed to win a Contract for Difference (CfD), raising doubts about the future of the link.

In July 2022, Stornoway Wind Farm on Lewis won a Contract for Difference (CfD) for 200MW capacity at a strike price of £46.39/MWh (at 2012 prices).

In July 2022, the electricity system operator, National Grid plc, published its "Pathway to 2030", which reaffirmed the need for a link, and proposing to increase the power capacity from 600MW to 1.8GW.

== See also ==
- Shetland HVDC Connection
