= Moray East =

'Moray East may refer to:

- Moray East Wind Farm, an offshore wind farm in the Moray Firth, Scotland
- Aberdeenshire North and Moray East (UK Parliament constituency), a House of Commons constituency in Scotland

== See also ==
- Edward Murray East (1879–1938), American plant geneticist, botanist, agronomist and eugenicist
