= Spittal, Highland =

Hamlet in Caithness, Scotland

Coordinates: 58.46771°N 3.42885°W

Spittal: Scottish Gaelic: Spideal
- Location within the Caithness area
- OS grid reference: ND167541
- Council area: Highland
- Lieutenancy area: Caithness
- Country: Scotland
- Sovereign state: United Kingdom
- Post town: Wick
- Postcode district: KW1 5
- Police: Scotland
- Fire: Scottish
- Ambulance: Scottish
- UK Parliament: Caithness, Sutherland and Easter Ross
- Scottish Parliament: Caithness, Sutherland and Ross

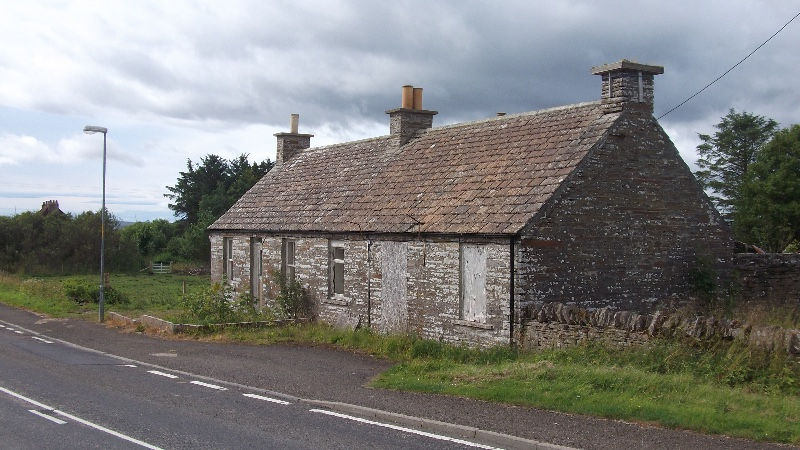
Cottage in Spittal (2015)

Spittal is a small hamlet in Caithness, Scottish Highlands and is in the Scottish council area of Highland. Spittal lies 9 miles (14 km) south of Thurso, and 1.5 miles (2.4 km) north of Mybster. The main A9 road runs past Spittal.

== Industry ==
A nearby electrical substation is the landing point for a 1,200 MW high-voltage direct current submarine power cable to Blackhillock Substation near Keith, Moray in northeast Scotland, crossing the Moray Firth. Another cable from Shetland is planned to reach Spittal.
