= Magallanes Renovables =

Spanish tidal stream turbine developer

Magallanes Renovables, S.L.
- Industry: Tidal turbines
- Founded: 2009
- Founder: Alejandro Marqués de Magallanes
- Subsidiaries: Magallanes Tidal Energy Ltd.

Magallanes Renovables, S.L. is a Spanish developer of floating tidal stream energy devices, set up in 2009. The company's head office is in Redondela, Galicia, with a UK subsidiary Magallanes Tidal Energy Ltd. based in Kirkwall.

They have tested their concept at the European Marine Energy Centre (EMEC) in Orkney, Scotland at small scale in 2014, and at full-scale between 2019 and 2023.

In 2022, they were amongst the first tidal stream developers to be awarded market support for commercial projects in the UK, under the Contracts for Difference (CfD) scheme.

== Device concept ==
Main characteristics of the full-size prototype.
Name	ATIR
Rated power	1500 kW
Weight	350 t
Dimensions (length/breadth/draft)	45 m / 6 m / 25 m
Rotors	2 (counter-rotating)
Rotor diameter & separation	19 m, 1 diameter
Rotor rated speed	17 rpm
Pitch	variable (0° to 270°)
Gearbox ratio	98
Generators	2 × 850 kW @ 690 V
Generators rated speed	1600 rpm
Converters	2 × 900 kW AC/AC

The Magalanes ATIR is a floating platform, like a ship's hull, which is moored in place by lines at the bow and stern. Under the water, about 15 metres (50 ft) below the hull, two three-bladed counter-rotating turbines are mounted at either end of a common driveshaft. These power the generators, which capture the energy of the tides flowing past. The design of the platform is modular, to make construction easier and cheaper.

The hull is symmetrical fore-aft, and both rotors are variable pitch, allowing the device to capture both the ebb and flood tide directions without being moved. The counter-rotating design improves efficiency, as the aft turbine captures some more energy from the slipstream of the first turbine, it also helps balance the torque reaction.

The novel device has been built using methodologies and experience from other related sectors, including naval architecture, offshore wind power, oil & gas. The design of the platform allows for access to the machinery during operation, without the need to disconnect the turbine.

The ATIR 2.0 device design has been certified with a "Basic Design Assessment" by Bureau Veritas.

== History ==
The company was founded in 2009 by Alejandro Marques de Magallanes.

In 2013–2014, a small-scale version of the ATIR device was tested at the EMEC nursery test site in Shapinsay Sound, although this was not grid-connected. The sea trials commences on 28 November 2013. The device was 1:10 scale, 6 metres (20 ft) long and 2.3 m (7.5 ft) wide, with a three-hull Trimaran design, however subsequent versions only have a single hull. The project reportedly cost 1.2m$US (about £0.73m, €0.89), funded through the European Marine Renewables Infrastructure Network (Marinet) project, government agencies in Spain, and private investors.

=== ATIR testing at EMEC ===
In 2019, the 1.5 MW (Note: Some sources quote the rated power as 1.7 MW or 2.0 MW) ATIR device was deployed at the EMEC Fall of Warness site, near the island of Eday. It was deployed in February and connected to the electricity grid in March 2019, generating power shortly after.

This device has two 19 m (62 ft) diameter rotors mounted below a 45 m (148 ft) long hull.

The device was constructed in Spain in the Ria de Vigo and launched in 2017 followed by a period of tow testing in Vigo bay. More than 20 tests were carried out in seven towing operations. The device generated up to 450 kW, limited by the power of the tug. It was then towed to Orkney in September 2018, after which it was installed and tested at EMEC. In 2020, the device was towed to Edinburgh for maintenance in the Imperial Dry Dock at the Port of Leith, before returning to site in April 2021. To enter the dock, the device had to be tipped onto its side using buoys.

The testing at EMEC was initially funded through the European OCEAN_2G project (Second Generation technologies in ocean Energy) coordinated by SAGRES SL, the parent company of Magallanes Renovables. Further funding through the Interreg OceanDEMO and the MaRINET2 projects allowed the testing to be extended beyond the initial two years.

Testing of the device was completed in 2023, after which the device was towed back to Vigo, Spain.

=== First commercial projects ===
Magallanes Tidal Energy has been awarded Contracts for Difference (CfD) in Allocation Rounds AR4–AR6 to supply subsidised electricity to the GB National Grid for several projects. These include a farm of six turbines at Morlais, North Wales, and three more at EMEC in Orkney, Scotland, as shown in the table below.

These will use the second-generation ATIR 2.0 device, which Magallanes completed the engineering design of in 2023.

CfD Allocation Round	Location	Total Capacity (MW)	Delivery Year	Strike Price (£/MWh)	Ref.
AR4, July 2022	Morlais	5.62	2025/26	178.54	
AR5, September 2023	Morlais	3.0	2027/28	198.00	
AR5, September 2023	EMEC	1.5	2027/28	198.00	
AR6, September 2024	EMEC	3.0	2028/29	172.00	

== Future plans ==
Magallanes hope to install their devices in other locations, including Spain, noting that the Strait of Gibraltar has significant potential.
