= Lerwick District Heating and Energy Recovery Plant =

Lerwick District Heating and Energy Recovery Plant is a district heating scheme based in Lerwick, The Lerwick District Heating Scheme is operated by Shetland Heat Energy and Power Ltd (SHEAP) while the Energy Recovery Plant (ERP) Shetland feeds into the scheme and is operated by the Shetland Islands Council. The main SHEAP offices are located close to the Lerwick Power Station along with a 12 MWh heat store. The scheme is one of the longest running schemes of its kind in the UK.

== Heat distribution ==
The district heating scheme has over 30 km of mains pipes connecting over 1,200 properties. These properties range from hospitals, schools, care homes, leisure centre, industry, retail and housing.

== Energy recovery plant ==
The energy recovery plant burns approximately 22,000 tonnes of waste per year from Shetland, Orkney and offshore and heats water for the district heating scheme.
