= Beatrice oil field =

Oil field off the coast of Scotland

Beatrice Oil Field
- Location within North Sea
- Country: Scotland, United Kingdom
- Region: North Sea off Scotland
- Location: Moray Firth, North Sea
- Offshore/onshore: Offshore
- Coordinates: 58°7′48″N 3°4′12″W
- Operator: Talisman Energy

Field history
- Discovery: 1976
- Start of development: 1977
- Start of production: 1980
- Abandonment: 2017

Production
- Estimated oil in place: 480 million barrels (~6.5×10^{7} t)
- Recoverable oil: 140 million barrels (~1.9×10^{7} t)
- Producing formations: Hettangian sandstone, siltstone, and claystone

The Beatrice Oil Field is a small oilfield consisting of 3 platforms located 24 km off the north east coast of Scotland. It began operations in 1980 with the field finally being decommissioned in 2017.

Work is ongoing to begin removing all structures.

The 84 turbine Beatrice Offshore Windfarm now sits in the same area and was completed in 2019.

== History and development of the field ==
Beatrice was the first field to be developed in the Moray Firth area, and at 24 km from the shore that can be seen from the land. Beatrice comprises 4 conventional steel platforms: Beatrice A, and two single satellite platforms B and C.

First discovered and developed by geologist Jack K. Larsen with Mesa Petroleum, and named after Mesa's founder T. Boone Pickens' wife, it covers an area of around 23 km^{2}. The oil is 2,100 m below the sea bed and about 8,000 tonnes of oil has been produced each day. Operation of the Beatrice oil field was then transferred to Talisman in 1997 until it was leased to Ithaca Energy who took over operations in 2008. Talisman resumed ownership of the field in 2015 from Ithaca Energy and is preparing to decommission the field.

== Platforms ==
The Beatrice Alpha complex consists of 2 platforms bridge-linked (50.5 m): 1 drilling/quarter platform (AD) and 1 processing/power generation (AP).

Beatrice B satellite platform is located to 3 miles north-east of the A complex, and was installed later. It is a drilling and a water injection platform. Beatrice C is designated a satellite water injection facility and was installed in September 1984. It pushes oil from the south-west end of the reservoir in direction of A. B and C are linked by pipelines with A. Fabrication details are given in the table.

Beatrice installations
Platform	Fabrication contractor	Site	Installation date	Function	Well slots	Production rate	Production to	Water injection
Beatrice AD	Dragados y Construcciones	Almena Spain	September 1979,	Drilling, wellhead, accommodation	32	–	AP	96,000 bbl/d
Beatrice AP	Dragados y Construcciones	Almena Spain	June 1980	Production	–	100,000 bopd	Nigg by 67 km 16-inch pipeline	–
Beatrice B	RGC Offshore	Methil	June 1983	Production, water injection	12	25,000 bopd	AP by 5.4 km 6-inch pipeline	30,000 bbl/d by 5.4 km 8-inch pipeline from AP
Beatrice C	Lewis Offshore	Stornoway	September 1984	Water injection	2	–	–	25,000 bbl/d by 4.8 km 8-inch pipeline from AP

=== Processing ===
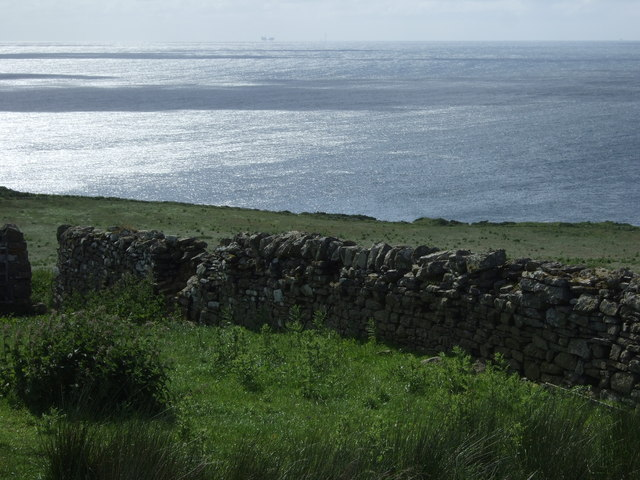
The Beatrice Oil Platform seen from the A9 between Latheronwheel and Latheron

Crude oil was heated to improve separation and flowed to one of two parallel 3-stage Separators (A and B) where gas was flashed off and produced water removed. Each separator had a capacity of 50,000 barrels per day. From the Separators oil was routed to the Crude Oil Transfer Pumps, through fiscal metering and into the 16-inch pipeline to shore.

Produced water flowed to an oily water interceptor before discharge overboard. Flash gas was used as fuel and the surplus was flared.

Treated injection water flowed to 3 booster pumps into 5 sea-water injection pumps each had a capacity 23,750 barrels per day.

Beatrice oil is exported via a 16-inch pipeline from Beatrice Alpha to a terminal at Nigg Energy Park in the Cromarty Firth, where it is stored until tanker shipment.

Since 1986/87 Beatrice has a 132/33kV power cable (via submarine) from Dunbeath. It connects the platform to the mainland power supply. It is used when the platform is fuel gas deficient.

Since 2007 Beatrice Alpha has been supplied electricity by two 5MW wind turbines which were constructed to test the viability of a windfarm being built in the area.

The successful pilot has led to an 84 turbine windfarm The Beatrice Offshore Windfarm Ltd (BOWL) being constructed.

== Future plans for Beatrice Oil Field ==
The Beatrice Field is now nearing the end of its productive life. Talisman explored the potential of the site for the world's first deep water wind farm. Led by Talisman Energy in partnership with Scottish and Southern Energy (and others), the Beatrice Wind Farm Demonstrator Project, at a cost of €41 million, saw two 5 MW wind turbines installed adjacent to the Beatrice oil field.

On 23 May 2016 the £2.6bn Beatrice Offshore Windfarm Ltd (BOWL) project was given the green light for construction by owners SSE (40%), Copenhagen Infrastructure Partners (CIP) (35%) and SDIC Power (25%). The project will be one of the largest private investments ever made in Scottish infrastructure.

The 588 MW, 84 turbine wind farm is expected to power approximately 450,000 homes (around three times the number of homes in the Moray and Highland regions).

In June 2016 contracts were awarded to Global Energy Group for the production and assembly of the turbines at Nigg Energy Park in Ross Shire and to Wick Harbour in connection with the assembly process. Offshore work began in 2017 and the wind farm was completed in 2019.

The Inner Moray Firth is designated as a Special Protection Area for wildlife conservation purposes. The Moray Firth contains a Special Area of Conservation (SAC) designated under the EU Habitats Directive, which is one of the largest Marine Protection Areas in Europe. The SAC protects the inner waters of the Moray Firth, from a line between Lossiemouth (on the south coast) and Helmsdale (on the north coast) westwards and although the proposed wind farm is outside this area the companies involved are working to ensure that the wildlife will not be impact in any way not just in the operating of the wind farm but also in the building phase.

== See also ==
- Nigg, Highland
- Moray Firth
- Special Areas of Conservation in Scotland
- Beatrice Wind Farm
