= Orbital Marine Power =

Scottish renewable energy company

Orbital Marine Power Ltd
- Formerly: Scotrenewables Tidal Power Ltd
- Industry: Tidal power
- Founded: August 2002; 23 years ago in Kirkwall, Orkney, Scotland
- Founder: Barry Johnston
- Website: https://orbitalmarine.com/

Orbital O2
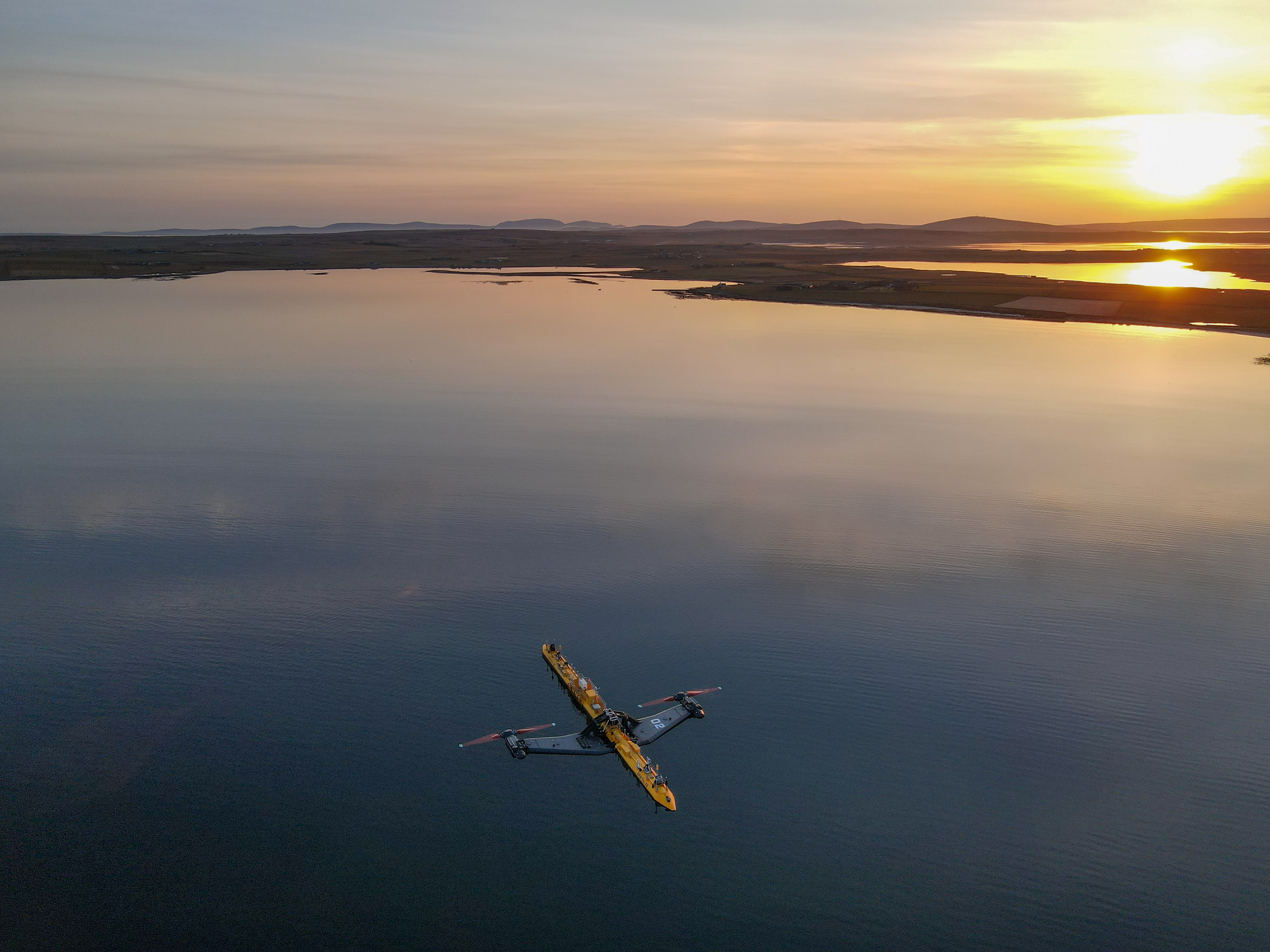
- Country: Scotland
- Location: Fall of Warness, Orkney Islands
- Coordinates: 59°8′39.48″N 2°48′55.68″W
- Status: Active
- Construction began: 2019
- Commission date: 2021
- Owner: Orbital Marine Power

Tidal power station
- Type: Tidal stream generator
- Type of TSG: Floating, twin horizontal-axis rotors
- Crosses: Fall of Warness

Power generation
- Units operational: 1 × 2 MW
- Units planned: 6 × 2.4 MW

External links
- Website: orbitalmarine.com

Orbital Marine Power (formerly Scotrenewables Tidal Power Ltd) is a Scottish renewable energy company focused on the development and global deployment of floating tidal stream turbine technology. The company was founded in 2002, and as of 2024 has built and tested three different turbines.

The floating turbine concept aims to reduce costs, as they can be towed to site and do not need large seabed foundations which can only be installed in the short periods of slack tide. The can also be towed back to shore for maintenance.

The O2 is Orbital's first commercial turbine and represents the culmination of more than 15 years of product development in the UK. The 74 m long turbine is expected to operate in the waters off Orkney for the next 15–20 years with the capacity to meet the annual electricity demand of around 2,000 UK homes with clean, predictable power from the fast-flowing waters, while offsetting approximately 2,200 tonnes of CO_{2} production per year. In a further ground-breaking element of the project, the O2 will provide power to the European Marine Energy Centre's onshore electrolyser to generate green hydrogen that will be used to demonstrate decarbonisation of wider energy requirements. As of 28 July 2021, it is the most powerful tidal turbine in the world and is anchored in the Fall of Warness off Eday, Orkney Islands.

== History ==
Scotrenewables Tidal Power was founded in Orkney 2002 by Barry Johnston to develop floating tidal stream turbines. Having grown up in Orkney, he was acutely aware of the power of the tides.

The company was rebranded as Orbital Marine Power in 2019, alongside a crowdfunding campaign that raised £7m towards constructing their first commercial turbine, the O2.

Three versions of their floating tidal turbines have been built and tested, the SR250, the SR2000, and the O2. Orbital are now developing their next-generation O2-X turbines, with six expected to be deployed in Orkney between 2026 and 2028.

=== SR250 ===
Orbital (then called Scotrenewables) was the first company in the world to successfully grid connect a floating tidal turbine, the SR250. This was a 250 kW rated machine, with twin contra-rotating 8 m diameter two-bladed rotors. These were mounted either side of the hull on 'rotor legs' that could be raised to limit draft when towing. The buoyant hull was a 34 m long, 2.3 m diameter tube. The device weighed 100 tonnes and was anchored by four catenary moorings via a quick connect turret on the hull tube. The rated current speed was 2.5 m/s (4.9 knots, 5.6 mph).

The SR250 was constructed by Harland & Wolff in Belfast in 2010, being launched early in 2011 and towed to the European Marine Energy Centre in Orkney. Initial tests were performed by towing the device through the water, achieving peak power for the first time in December 2011. The device was connected to the Orkney electricity grid in 2012.

=== SR2000 ===
In 2012, Scotrenewables was awarded a £1.24m grant towards the £9.24m project to design and build the 2 MW SR2000 turbine. This was part of round two of the Wave & Tidal Energy: Research, Development & Demonstration Support (WATERS) scheme of the Scottish Government.

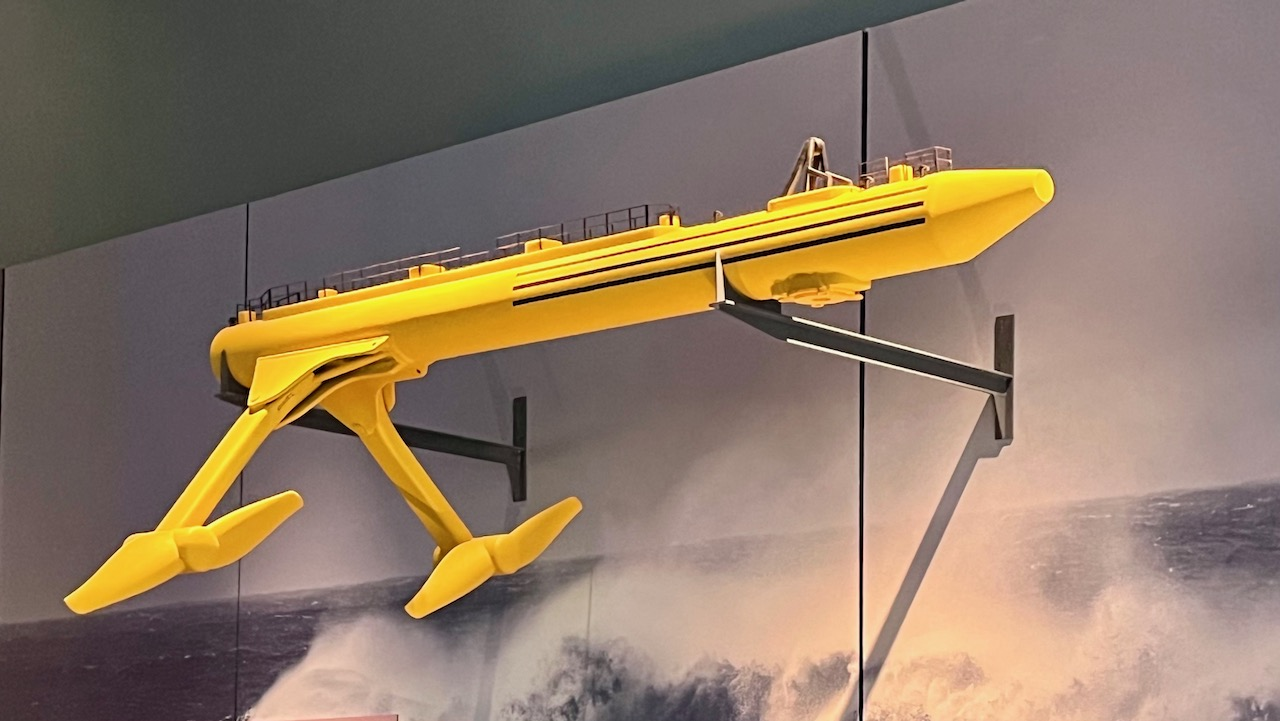
Model of SR2000 tidal turbine at National Museum of Scotland

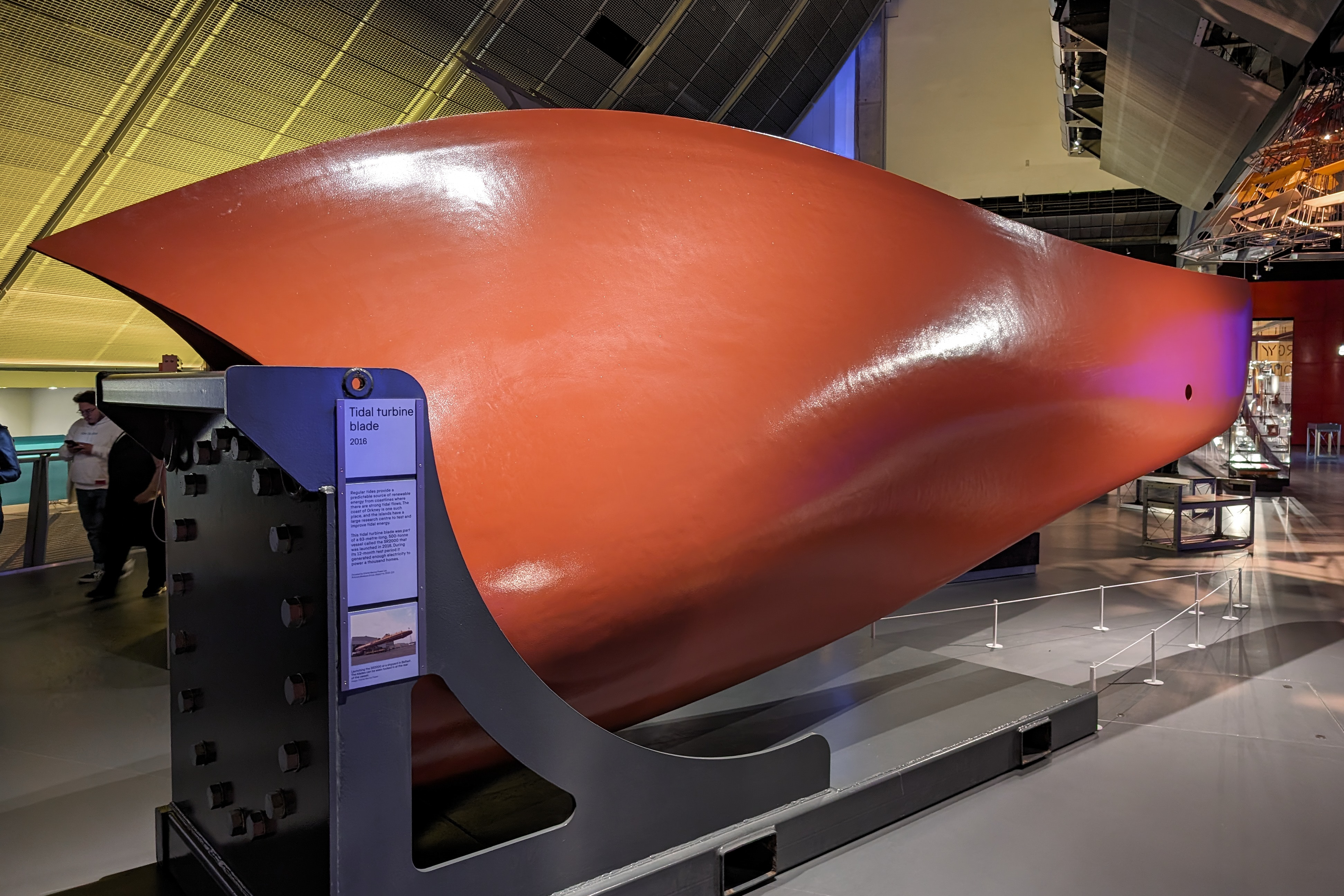
Turbine blade from SR2000 in the Science Museum, London

In 2016, the company launched the SR2000, at the time the world's most powerful tidal stream turbine, at 2 MW. The SR2000 produced in excess of 3 GWh of electricity over its initial 12-month continuous test programme. At the time this represented more power from a single turbine than had been generated cumulatively by the wave and tidal sector in Scotland over the 12 years prior to the launch of the SR2000.

The SR2000 was also constructed by Harland & Wolff in Belfast, launched on 12 May 2016. This turbine had twin 16 m diameter rotors, a 63 m long hull, and weighed 550 tonnes. It first exported power to the grid in October 2016, and was tested until September 2018. The turbine was towed to Blyth, Northumberland for decommissioning by Thompsons of Prudhoe.

The SR2000 was able to generate at rated power in significant wave heights of up to 2 metres (6.6 ft) and at reduced power in waves of up to 3.5 m (11 ft).

=== O2 ===
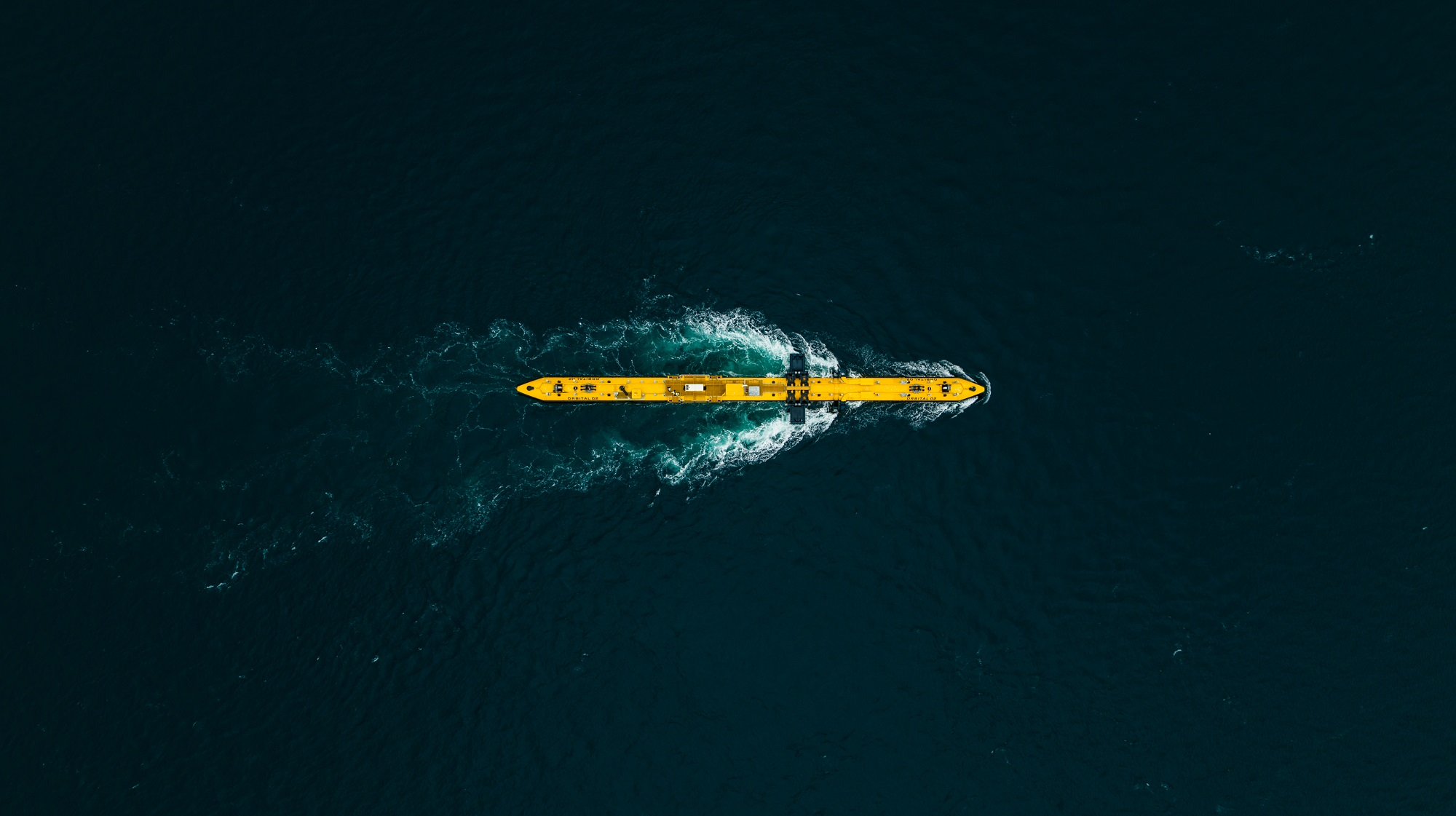
Aerial photo of Orbital O2

The Orbital O2 has twin 20 m diameter rotors, a 72 m long hull, and weighs 680 tonnes. The O2 incorporates key innovations and lessons from the company's previous prototype, the SR2000, that, on a like-for-like basis, enable a 35% improvement in yield at the EMEC site. The twin rotors have a combined swept area of over 600 square metres, the largest ever on a single tidal generating platform to date. Each rotor is connected to a 1 MW generator, with a rated current speed of 2.5 m/s (5.6 mph; 4.9 kn). The blades have the ability to pitch through 360°, enabling power to be captured from both tidal directions without need to yaw the entire platform.

The turbine was constructed in Dundee, Scotland by Texo Group. The hull was produced by Grey Fabrication in Cupar, and the four composite blades were manufactured by A C Marine & Composites (ACMC) in Gosport. The entire structure was then protected from the elements out at sea by BROL-Coat Ltd. They gritblasted everything before applying over 4000 litres of paint, ultimately adding an extra 4t in weight.

The O2 turbine was launched from the city into the Tay Estuary on 22 April 2021 via a submersible barge. It was then towed to the Fall of Warness site in April and grid connected in July 2021. The draft when towing is just 3 m.

The floating structure is held on station with a four-point mooring system where each mooring chain has the capacity to lift over 50 double decker buses. Electricity is transferred from the turbine via a dynamic cable to the seabed and a static cable along the seabed to the local onshore electricity network.

=== O2-X ===
The next-generation turbine, the O2-X will be able to generate 2.4 MW of renewable energy, and is designed to be adaptable to multiple sites. Orbital are working with Lloyd's Register to certify the turbine against International Electrotechnical Commission TS 62600–4, initially aiming for an IECRE Feasibility Statement, before full certification which would formally allow the move to serial production. The IECRE Feasibility Statement was issued by Lloyd's in early 2025.

== Future deployments ==
=== Scotland ===
In July 2022, Orbital were awarded contracts for 4.8 MW and 2.4 MW in the UK Contracts for Difference (CfD) AR4 auction, to supply electricity from turbines at Eday from 2026/27. In September 2023, they were awarded a further 4.8 MW plus 2.4 MW, to be commissioned in 2027/28. This equates to a pipeline of six O2-X turbines. Orbital announced in October 2023 they were successful in applying for the Horizon Europe sustainable tidal farms call, and would be leading the EURO-TIDES project to develop a 9.6 MW array.

Orbital announced in May 2024 that Global Energy Group had been appointed as the preferred supplier to manufacture the turbines for these initial Orkney CfD projects. Manufacture of the turbines was expected to start later that year at the Port of Nigg.

Orbital have also secured an option agreement from Crown Estate Scotland and a grid connection for a 30 MW array to be constructed in the Westray Firth, to the north of the existing O2 deployment.

=== Canada ===
Plans have also been announced to deploy a next-generation 2.4 MW O2X turbine at the Fundy Ocean Research Centre for Energy (FORCE), located in the Bay of Fundy, Canada. This would be in partnership with project developer Eauclaire Tidal. In November 2025, the project was expanded to include an additional two berths at FORCE, giving a total expected capacity of 16.5 MW. The electrical connection rights are accompanied by 15-year power purchase agreements with Nova Scotia Power, awarded following a competitive tendering process. Also in November, Fisheries and Oceans Canada issued authorisation under the Fisheries Act for the first three turbines to be deployed in a staged approach, starting with a single device. Following environmental monitoring and analysis, additional turbines can be added.

=== USA ===
In September 2024, Orbital was awarded funding through the United States Department of Energy (DOE) Testing Expertise and Access to Marine Energy Research (TEAMER) programme for a project called "Site identification framework and environmental compliance for floating ocean current turbines in US waters". Pacific Northwest National Laboratory and Florida Atlantic University are also partners in the project.

Orcas Power and Light Cooperative (OPALCO) in San Juan County, Washington has been developing plans for tidal power in the Rosario Strait since 2018. In March 2024, Orbital was announced as the technology partner for the project. In June 2024, the project was awarded 12 months of funding from the DOE for environmental and flow assessments. The change in priorities of the Trump administration may however delay the project.

=== Other ===
Orbital previously announced in 2018 that they planned to deploy their floating 2 MW Orbital O2 turbines at the Morlais site in Wales.
