= Beatrice Wind Farm =

Scottish offshore wind farm

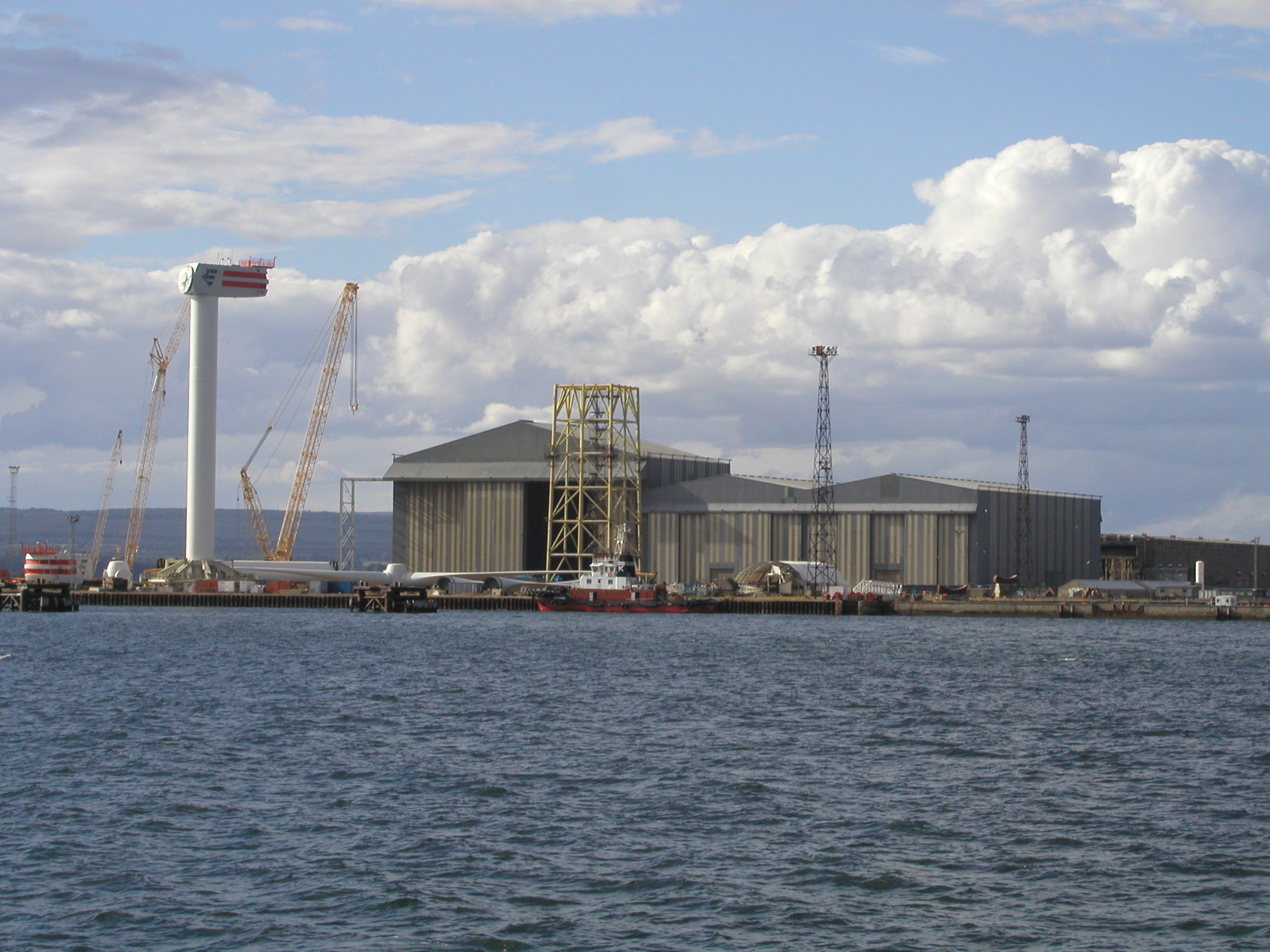
- 5 MW wind turbine under construction for Beatrice at Nigg fabrication yard on the Cromarty Firth
- Country: United Kingdom
- Location: Moray Firth, North Sea
- Coordinates: 58°08′N 3°04′W
- Status: Operational
- Commission date: July 2018
- Construction cost: £2.6bn
- Owners: Equitix; Red Rock Power Limited; SSE Renewables; The Renewables Infrastructure Group

Wind farm
- Type: Offshore
- Max. water depth: 45m
- Distance from shore: 13km
- Hub height: 101m
- Rotor diameter: 154m

Power generation
- Units operational: 84 × 7 MW
- Make and model: Siemens Gamesa SWT-7.0-154 (84)
- Nameplate capacity: 588 MW

External links
- Website: www.beatricewind.com

Wind farm layout

The Beatrice Offshore Wind Farm now known as Beatrice Offshore Windfarm Ltd (BOWL) project, is an offshore wind farm close to the Beatrice oil field in the Moray Firth, part of the North Sea 13 km off the north east coast of Scotland. It has 84 Siemens Gamesa 7 MW wind turbines, and was built between 2017 and 2019.

Initially, it consisted of a demonstration of two 5 MW REpower 5M turbines, which supplied power to the oil platforms. These were installed in 2006 and 2007.

== Demonstration project ==
The Beatrice Wind Farm Demonstrator Project was a joint venture between Scottish and Southern Energy and Talisman Energy (UK) to build and operate an evaluation wind farm in the deep water close to the Beatrice Oil field that Talisman Energy was planning to decommission. It was a pilot to test wind farms in water depths over 40m, which had not been done at that time, and to examine the feasibility of building a commercial wind farm in deep water. The site was 13 km (8.1 mi; 7.0 nmi) from the Scottish coast with a water depth of around 45 m (148 ft). The evaluation project was proposed to last five years.

At the time, this broke a number of records. The first turbine became the world's largest offshore wind turbine, installed in the deepest water and furthest from shore. It was also the first turbine to be installed offshore in a single lift.

In 2004, the "Distant Offshore Windfarms with No Visual Impact in Deepwater" (DOWNVInD) project received €6m in European funding. It also received £6m in funding, split between the Scottish Executive and the Department of Trade & Industry (DTI). The total cost of this project was almost €46.2m.

All the electricity generated was fed to the nearby Beatrice Alpha oil platform, which was also connected to the national grid. The platforms had a demand of around 14 MW, which was reduced by around 30% by the turbines.

=== Construction ===
The turbines were installed on four-leg jacket foundations. The jacket design was developed by the Norwegian company OWEC Tower AS, and fabricated in Scotland by Burntisland Fabrications. Each jacket was fixed to the seabed by four piles 72 inches (1.8 m) in diameter. Once in place, these were permanently fixed by swaging, plastically deforming the metal under high pressure.

On Sunday 20 August 2006, the first REpower 5M turbine was loaded onto the crane barge Rambiz at Nigg. It was transported with the 63m long blades attached to the nacelle and tower, which had a combined weight of about 1000 tonnes. The complete structure was lifted using a special "tower interface frame" at the bottom.

The second turbine was initially planned to be installed in September 2006, but this was delayed due to bad weather. The barge vessel was then needed for another job, adding further delay. Turbine B was finally installed in July 2007.

=== Decommissioning ===
The oilfield ceased operations in March 2015, and the demonstrator wind farm is expected to be decommissioned between 2024 and 2027.

== Commercial windfarm ==
In February 2009, the partnership of SSE Renewables and Repsol Nuevas Energias UK, was awarded exclusivity by The Crown Estate to develop the Beatrice offshore wind farm in the Outer Moray Firth just to the north of the existing demonstrator turbines. In April 2014, the UK Energy Secretary Ed Davey announced that the Beatrice Wind Farm would be one of eight projects awarded a contract for difference to set the price paid for its power for the next 15 years.

On 23 May 2016 approval was given for a £2.6bn expansion of the wind farm to 84 turbines with a capacity of 588MW of electricity, enough to supply 450,000 homes.

In June 2016 contracts were awarded to the Global Energy Group, in association with Siemens Wind Power, for fabrication and assembly of the turbines at Nigg Energy Park in Ross Shire, and to Wick Harbour for the assembly and transport process. Several other Highland towns are expected to benefit during the construction phase due to the expected influx of workers. Work began in April 2017.

=== Construction and grid connection ===
Offshore construction began in April 2017. As of 15 May 2018, 56 of the total 84 turbine and 2 OTM jackets had been installed, first power from the main phase was generated in July 2018, with full commissioning expected to follow in spring 2019.

In January 2019, the wind farm was connected to the new Caithness - Moray Link. The high voltage direct current link enables power generated at Beatrice and other projects to be sent to high population areas in southern Scotland.

The link which runs from Caithness to Moray, which comes ashore at Portgordon in Moray, is connected to the new Beatrice/BOWL thence to Blackhillock Substation near Keith in Moray, the UK's biggest electricity substation as of January 2019.

Installation and commissioning for all 84 turbines was completed on 15 May 2019.

A cable broke in April 2025, reducing capacity to 50%, and was repaired by November 2025.

== Controversy ==
In October 2018 details emerged that migrant workers were being used increasingly in the construction phase.

It came out that 11 Russian Workers were arrested at Aberdeen Airport in 2017 as they were working illegally on Seafarers documents.

In an unexpected move, the UK Home Office granted a 6-month waiver so that the crew could continue to work. This has been extended twice until 2019.

== See also ==
- Wind power in Scotland
- Wind power in the United Kingdom
- List of offshore wind farms in the United Kingdom
- Beatrice Oil Field
- Renewable energy in Scotland
