= Viking Wind Farm =

Wind farm in the Shetland Islands, Scotland

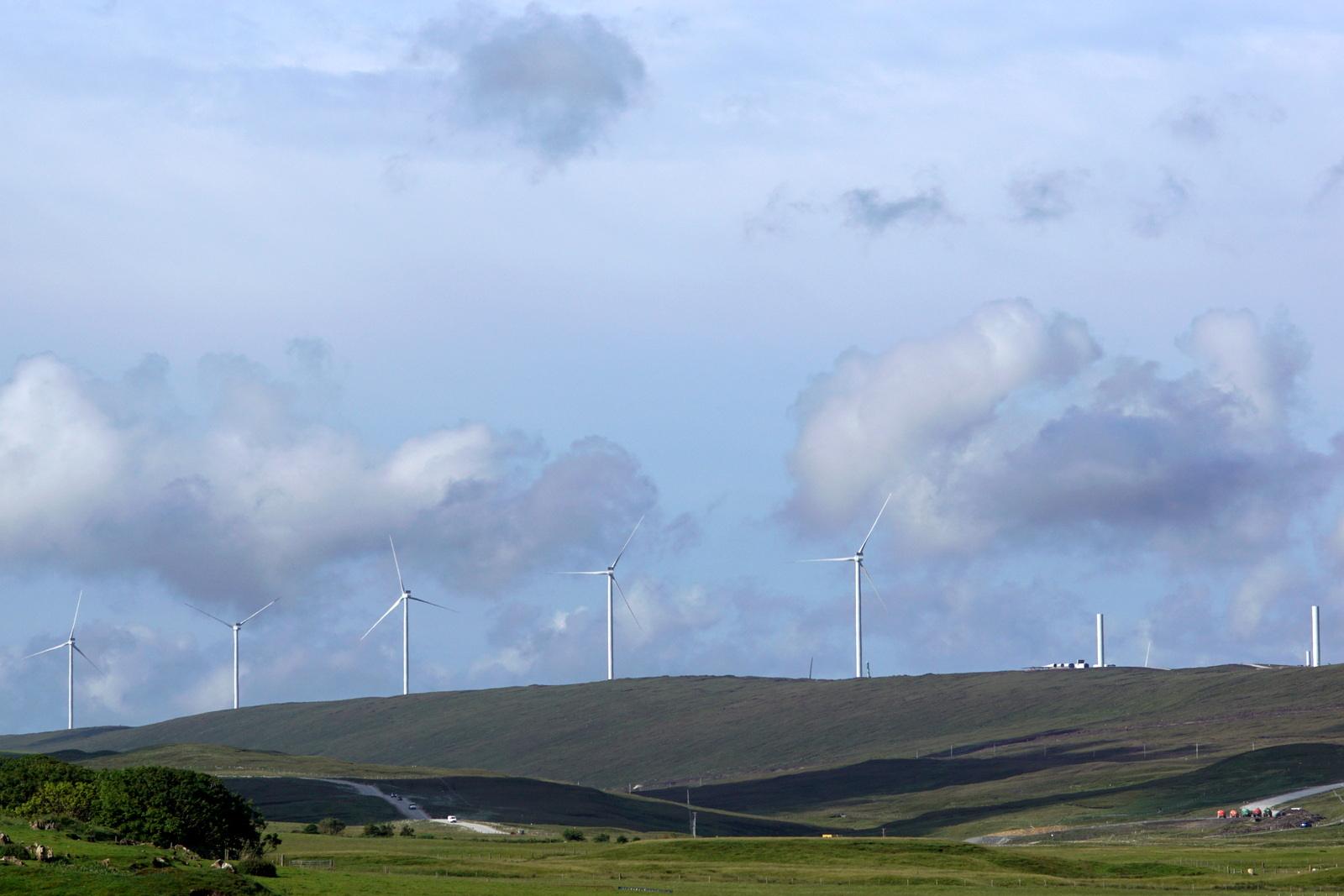
- Country: United Kingdom
- Location: Shetland
- Coordinates: 60°17′12″N 1°15′40″W
- Construction cost: £566 million (estimated, 103 turbines)
- Owners: Shetland Charitable Trust; SSE plc
- Operator: SSE Renewables

Wind farm
- Type: Onshore
- Rotor diameter: 117 m (384 ft)

Power generation
- Units operational: 103 × 4.3 MW
- Make and model: MHI Vestas V117-4.2 MW (103)
- Nameplate capacity: 443 MW
- Annual net output: 1.8 TWh (estimated)

External links
- Website: www.vikingenergy.co.uk

Viking Wind Farm is a large on-shore wind farm in the Shetland Islands which was developed by Viking Energy, (Note: Shetland Council formed "Viking Energy Ltd" (90% owned by Shetland Charitable Trust) as an energy development company, SSE formed SSE Viking as a subsidiary. The 50:50 joint venture of the two companies is termed "Viking Energy Partnership".) a partnership between Shetland Islands Council and SSE plc. It has a generation capacity of 443 MW.

Construction started in September 2020 and the Viking Windfarm and its HVDC connection were completed in August 2024.

== History ==
=== Initial plan ===
In 2005 SSE and Shetland Islands Council (via development company Viking Energy.) signed a memorandum of understanding to combine independent proposals for 300 MW wind farms on mainland Shetland and jointly develop a large scale (600 MW) wind farm. The companies formalised the agreement in January 2007.

In 2009 the developers (Note: A joint venture between SSE and the Shetland Islands Trust. The trust was an organisation initially created to distribute income from oil installations on the island.) submitted a planning application for 150 turbines (estimated 600 MW capacity) on the main island of Shetland.

In 2010 the plan was reduced in scope, with the number of turbines reduced to 127; the turbines were to be 3.6 MW machines with hub height of 90 metres (300 ft) and blade tip height of 145 m (476 ft). The scope area of the wind farm was 129 km^{2} (50 sq mi), of which only 104 ha (1.04 km^{2}) would be permanently built upon, additionally the plan required construction of approximately 104 km (65 mi) of access roads, and the quarrying of 1,470,000 m^{3} (0.00147 km^{3}) of rock, and the disturbance of between 650 and 900,000 cubic metres of peat. The development was dependent on the Shetland HVDC Connection being built connecting Shetland to the UK mainland's national grid. The cost of the connector was estimated at £300 million in late 2011; Viking Energy would be liable for 10% or less of the cost, other energy producing projects in Shetland, such as Aegir wave farm, were also dependent on the grid connector being built.

The scheme proved contentious with both significant opposition and support, receiving 2,772 formal objections and 1,115 in support, as well as objections from RSPB Scotland; in part due to concerns on its impact on the rare Whimbrel.

=== Approval and legal challenges ===
The converter station at Kergord for the HVDC link to the Scottish mainland reached an initial stage of planning consent in early 2011, after several previous attempts starting 2009. In April 2012, the Scottish Minister for Energy, Enterprise and Tourism, Fergus Ewing, granted planning permission for a 103 wind turbine development, withholding consent on 24 turbines in Delting Parish due to potential interference with equipment at Scatsta Airport, and limiting maximum height to 145 m (476 ft). The reduced development had an estimated capacity of up to 370 MW. The income from the development to shareholder Shetland Islands Trust was estimated at £20 million per year and the capital cost of the development was estimated at £556 million.

In September 2013, a ruling on an objection from Sustainable Shetland to the development held that the consent given under section 36 of the Electricity Act 1989 was incompetent because Viking Energy did not hold a licence under the 1989 Act, and that the Scottish Ministers had failed to have proper regard to their obligations under the Birds Directive [2009/147/EC] to the protected Whimbrel species.

In October 2013, the Scottish Government signalled its intention to appeal the decision. In July 2014, appeal judges at Edinburgh's Court of Session announced that there was insufficient reason to stop the wind farm and gave the project the go-ahead. Sustainable Shetland appealed the decision at the Supreme Court of the United Kingdom but lost the appeal in February 2015. They were also refused leave to appeal to the European Court of Justice. Viking applied to get electricity price subsidies under the UK government's low carbon "Contracts for Difference" programme. Due to the slow progress of Viking's application, two of their four staff were made redundant in 2017.

=== Recent history ===
In 2019, Viking Energy was unsuccessful in winning a CfD contract in the government auction held in September 2019, making the future of the windfarm uncertain.

The wind farm depends on the construction of the Shetland HVDC Connection. In April 2020, Ofgem approved revised proposals for that project, subject to 'evidence that the Shetland Viking Wind Farm project will go ahead'.

On 17 June 2020, the project sponsor, SSE Renewables, made a final investment decision to proceed with the Viking Wind Farm investment, conditional on certain industry code modifications, and "the outcome of the consultation on Ofgem's minded-to position to approve the transmission link, expected in July 2020". According to Shetland News, this meant that both the wind farm and the HVDC Connection "are likely to go ahead".

Construction works started in September 2020 and the farm is due to be operational by 2024. All 103 turbines were installed by August 2023. In May 2024, transmission work stopped due to a peat slide.

The first power was generated in June 2024, and August 2024 the wind farm was completed and on line, along with the Shetland HVDC Connection.

== Design ==
Turbines were scheduled to be erected in Kergord, North Nesting, and South Nesting. Original proposals included 24 turbines in the Delting area (refused 2012 consent.) and 23 turbines in the Collafirth area (removed from application.)

Estimated construction time for the 127 turbine farm was five years. The wind farm was expected to have a high utilisation rate, as smaller wind turbines on the island had attained a high capacity factor.

== Objections ==
Initially proposed as a 150 turbine 600 MW project in 2009, the scheme had significant opposition, on grounds including effects on wildlife, and the general environment; part of the wind farm was also removed because of a potential interference with equipment at Scatsta Airport.

== Controversies ==
=== Constraint payments controversy ===
According to the Renewable Energy Foundation (REF), despite not yet being fully operational, the Viking Energy windfarm has been paid over £2.5m of “constraint payments” in August 2024, for discarding more than 60% of the electricity that the wind farm operators claim they could have generated, given the prevailing wind condition. Constraint payments are made by the Electricity System Operator (ESO) to windfarms to switch off the supply of electricity during times when the amount of electricity being generated exceeds the capacity of the network to transfer it to consumers. This amount of these constraint payments is almost as much as the Viking Energy windfarm will pay out for a full year of community benefits. Ultimately it is the consumers who will pay for these “constraint payments”.
