= Moray Firth =

Inlet near Inverness, Scotland

- Location in Scotland

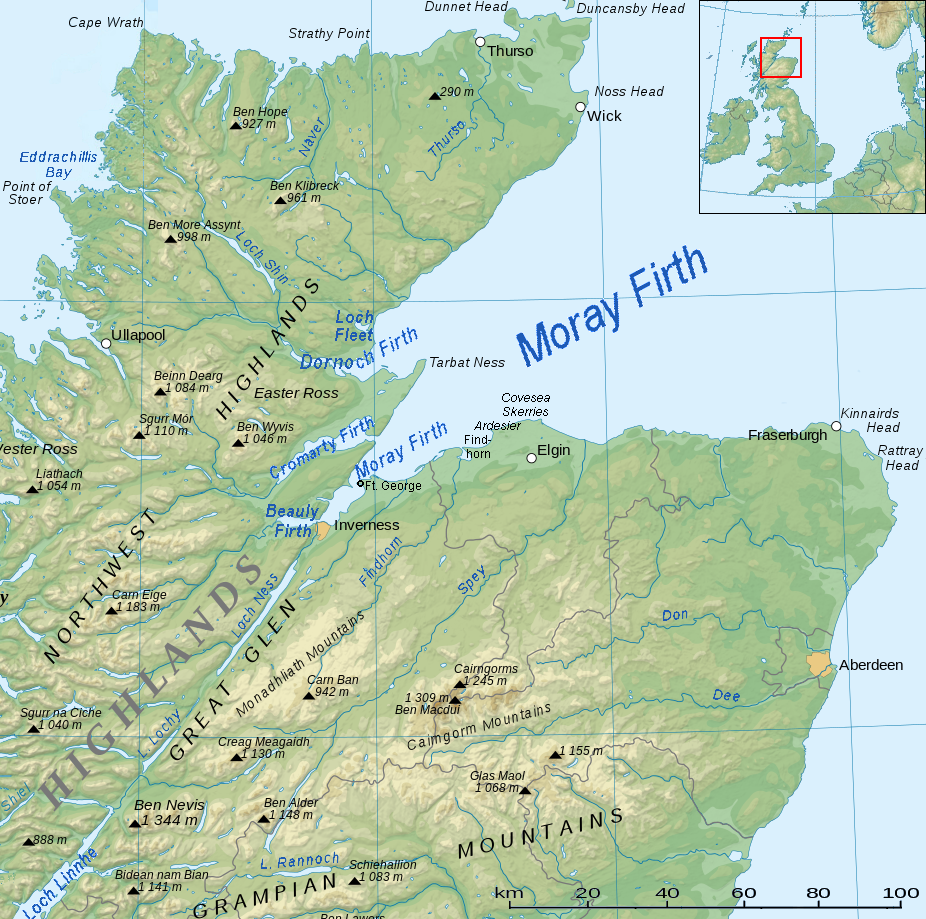
- Map of the Firth
- Location: Scotland, United Kingdom
- Coordinates: 57°50′N 03°35′W

Ramsar Wetland
- Official name: Inner Moray Firth
- Designated: 22 July 1999
- Reference no.: 1002

The Moray Firth (/ˈmʌri-/; Scottish Gaelic: An Cuan Moireach, Linne Mhoireibh or Caolas Mhoireibh) is a roughly triangular inlet (or firth) of the North Sea, north and east of Inverness, which is in the Highland council area of the north of Scotland.

It is the largest firth in Scotland, stretching from Duncansby Head (near John o' Groats) in the north, in the Highland council area, and Fraserburgh in the east, in the Aberdeenshire council area, to Inverness and the Beauly Firth in the west.

Therefore, three council areas have Moray Firth coastline: Highland to the west and north of the Moray Firth and Highland, Moray and Aberdeenshire to the south. The firth has more than 500 miles (800 km) of coastline, much of which is cliff.

== Etymology ==
The firth is named after the 10th-century Province of Moray, whose name in turn is believed to derive from the sea of the firth itself. The local names Murar or Morar are suggested to derive from Muir, the Gaelic for sea, whilst Murav and Morav are believed to be rooted in Celtic words Mur (sea) and Tav (side), condensed to Mur'av for sea-side. The firth has, in the past, been referred to as the Murro Firth and the Morra Firth. 'Murro' and 'Morra' being variants of Moray; these older variations are also shown in older names for Morayshire itself, such as Morrowshire.

== Geography ==
View from Findhorn: The hills across inner Moray Firth end in Tarbat Ness. The mountains in the background rise behind Dornoch Firth.

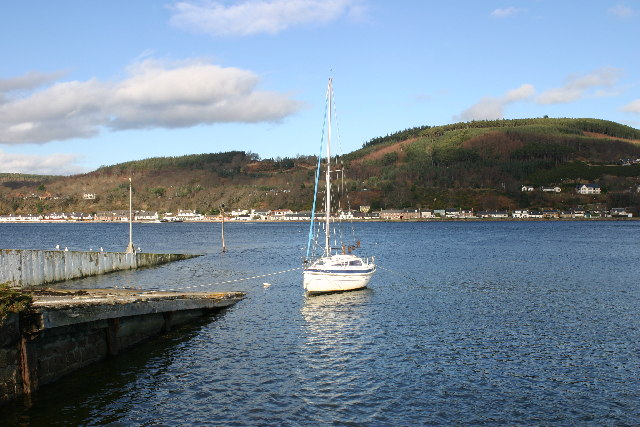
The strait between Moray Firth and Beauly Firth

A number of rivers flow into the Moray Firth, including the River Ness, the River Findhorn and the River Spey. Various smaller firths and bays are inlets of the firth, including the Cromarty Firth and the Dornoch Firth. The Pentland Firth has its eastern mouth at the Moray Firth's northern boundary.

The Moray Firth is effectively two firths, the Inner Moray Firth 57°33′N 04°09′W, which was traditionally known as the Firth of Inverness, and the Outer Moray Firth which is more open North Sea water. The name "Firth of Inverness" is rarely found on modern maps, but extended from the Beauly Firth in the west, to Chanonry Point in the east.

The Moray Firth is visible for considerable distances, including a long range view from as far to the east as Longman Hill. From Buckie, on a clear day it is possible to see Wick in the far north of Scotland more than 80 km (50 mi) away.

From Lossiemouth it is possible to see the hills of Caithness and the hills are easily identified, one being Morven and the other being Scaraben. From Burghead, the white mass of Dunrobin Castle can just be made out in the distance on a very clear day; from Nairn, the two red bands on the Tarbat Ness Lighthouse around 30 km (20 mi) away, can be seen with binoculars.

The Great Channel in the Inner Moray Firth, was dredged by engineers in 1917 for the safe passage of ships that wanted to avoid the long and dangerous passage around the north of Scotland, by transiting the Caledonian Canal. The Channel went from the entrance of Munlochy Bay to the Meikle Mee Starboard Hand Mark, but was not maintained and filled in very quickly.

== Geology ==
The Moray Firth is of tectonic origin, the formation is related in part to the Helmsdale Fault. For some time during the last ice age, the whole of the present day Moray Firth was a huge glacier. Nevertheless, the inner part and its side-inlets, the Cromarty Firth and Dornoch Firth, are true fjords themselves.

Though there is a reasonable tide with mean tide ranges of about three metres (ten feet), only some of the rivers draining into the bay have estuaries. Masses of sediment from the adjacent mountains have formed spits around several mouths. Those of River Ness and River Carron have significantly narrowed the fjords they enter.

== Conservation and economy ==
The Moray Firth is one of the most important places on the British coast for observing dolphins and whales. The most common species are the bottlenose dolphin and harbour porpoise, with occasional sightings of the common dolphin and minke whale.

The popular wildlife viewing area located at Chanonry Point host some spectacular displays of dolphins within the inner Moray Firth. Also, visitor centres at Spey Bay and North Kessock are run by the Whale and Dolphin Conservation Society, where dolphins and other wildlife can often be seen. The old jetty at the Fort George Point is the location of the Dolphin Research Centre, with leading marine biologist Prof.

Greame Taylor working part-time studying hunting and breeding habits and part-time working with the Community Council giving tours and teaching the ways of the dolphin.

It is also an important oil field and fishing grounds. The Beatrice oil field about 20 miles south of Wick and east of Helmsdale was the closest of the North Sea oil fields; since being decommissioned in 2017 it is the site of the Beatrice Wind Farm. Much of the fishing industry focuses on scallops and Norway lobsters. The area also contains the Moray East (completed) and Moray West (completed in April 2025) offshore wind farms.

The Inner Moray Firth is designated as a special protection area for wildlife conservation purposes. The Moray Firth contains a special area of conservation (SAC) designated under the EU Habitats Directive, which is one of the largest marine protection areas in Europe. The SAC protects the inner waters of the Moray Firth, from a line between Lossiemouth (on the south coast) and Helmsdale (on the north coast) westwards.

== Map references ==
	Latitude and longitude	Ordnance Survey grid reference
Duncansby Head	58°38′40″N 03°01′28″W	ND405733
Chanonry Point	57°34′29″N 04°05′22″W	NH750557
Inverness (Kessock Bridge)	57°29′58″N 04°13′43″W	NH664476
Fraserburgh (Kinnaird Head)	57°41′56″N 02°00′03″W	NJ999676
