= Ocean Winds =

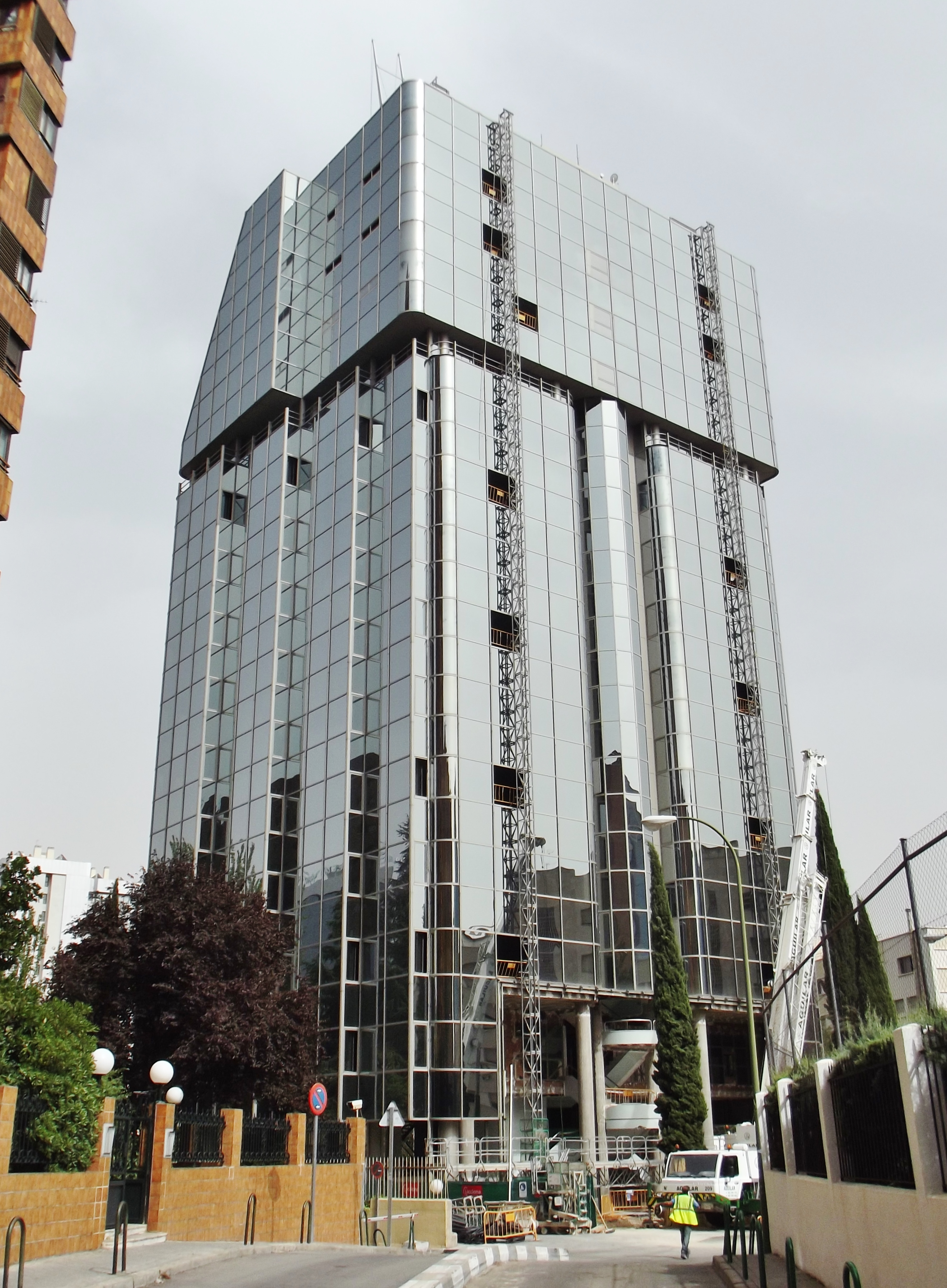
Company headquarters, Madrid

Ocean Winds is a Spanish company which primarily develops wind farms. The company was established in 2020 as a 50-50 joint venture between Engie and EDP Renováveis and is based in Madrid, Spain.

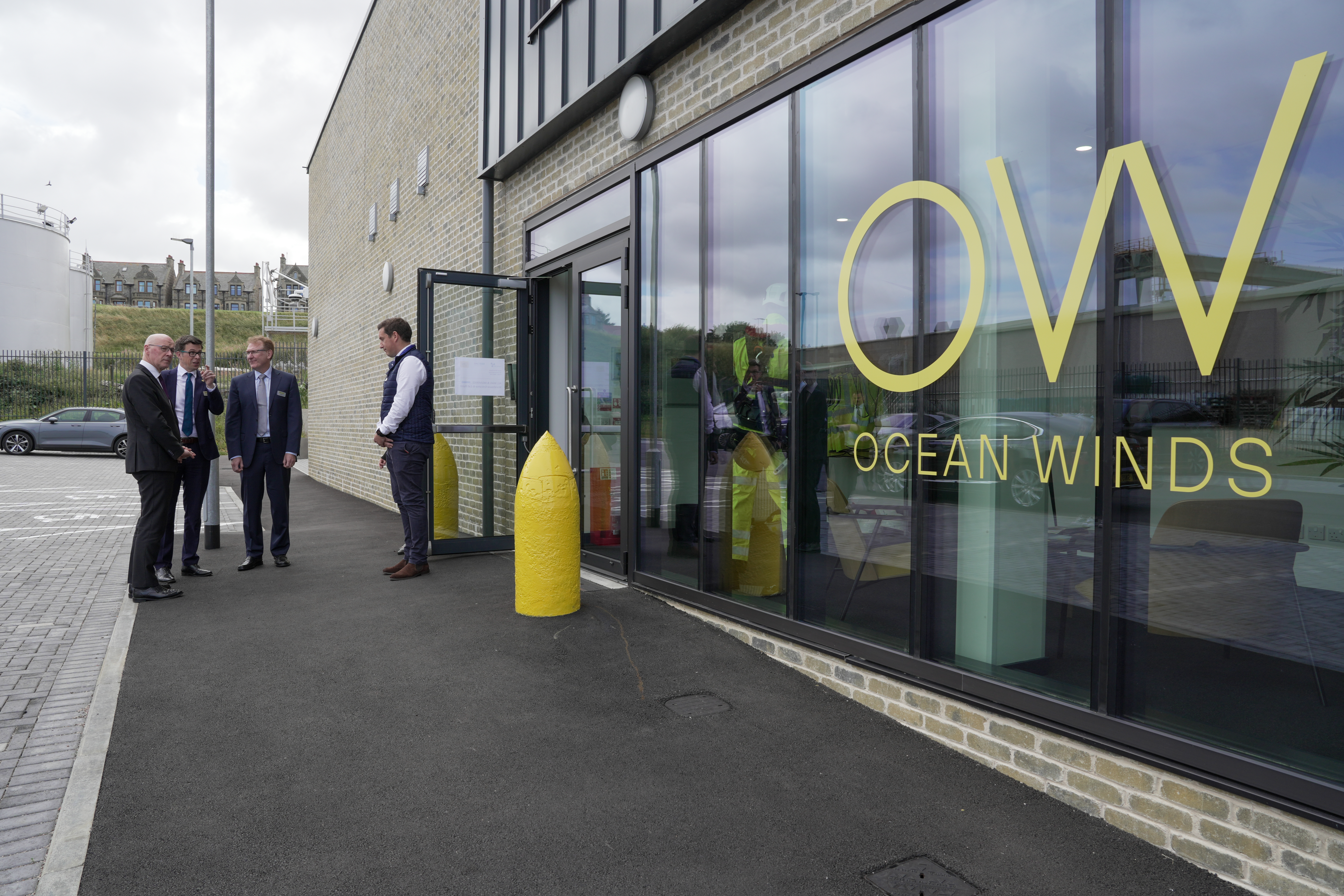
First Minister of Scotland John Swinney visiting an Ocean Winds office in Scotland in 2024
