= Blackhillock Substation =

Electrical substation in Scotland

Coordinates: 57.523°N 2.948°W

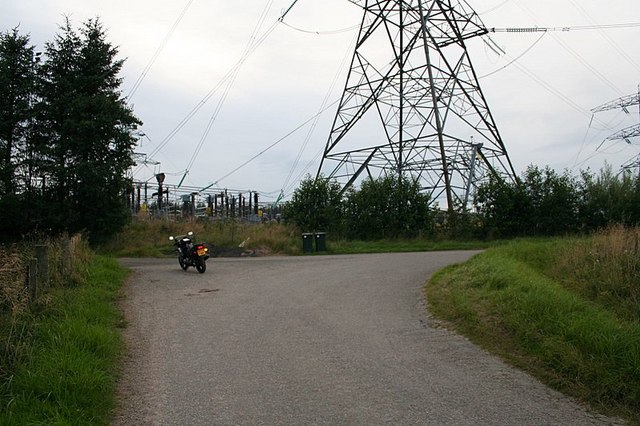
Outside substation prior to upgrade

Blackhillock Substation is an electrical substation located in the north east of Scotland, near the town of Keith in Moray.

It is owned and operated by Scottish Southern Electricity Network (SSEN). Covering an area the size of 24 football pitches, it is as of January 2019, the UK's largest substation and Europe's second biggest by area.

Construction began in early 2015 to upgrade the existing substation so it could accommodate the new 1,200 MW Caithness - Moray Link. The £1bn construction project had four main elements: 400kV and 132kV gas-insulated substations, one 275kV air-insulated substation, a High Voltage Direct Current (HVDC) converter for the Caithness - Moray subsea link and a HVDC underground cable from the substation to Portgordon. In January 2019 construction and commissioning were completed making it the UK's largest operating substation. It is seen as integral to the UK electricity grid as the north of Scotland generates much renewable energy via windfarms. The upgrade was primarily done to accommodate the 588 MW offshore Beatrice Windfarm, and the 177 MW Dorenell wind farm is also directely connected at 132 kV.

Blackhillock connects to the adjacent Whitehillock substation at 400 kV, serving the 882 MW Moray West offshore wind farm.

A 300 MW / 600 MWh grid battery started construction at the site in February 2023, and connected for grid services in March 2025.

== See also ==
- Electrical Generation in the UK
- Renewable energy in the United Kingdom
