= Contracts for Difference (UK energy) =

UK market support mechanism for low carbon electricity generation

Contracts for Difference (CfD) are the main market support mechanism or subsidy for low carbon electricity generation in the UK. The scheme replaced the Renewables Obligation which closed to new generation in March 2017. The CfD scheme is administered by the Low Carbon Contracts Company (LCCC), which is owned by the UK Government.

The scheme offers a fixed "Strike Price" to generators over a typically 15 year long contract period. This provides financial certainty, unlike the wholesale electricity market which can fluctuate significantly. With the contract for difference, if the market price for electricity drops below the Strike Price, LCCC pays the generator the shortfall, however if the market price rises, the generator must pay back the difference. The costs, or benefits, of the scheme are passed onto consumers via their electricity bills.

The contracts are awarded using a reverse auction in annual "Allocation Rounds" (AR) where companies submit sealed bids for a project capacity and cost. Contracts are awarded to the lowest cost projects first, until a predefined budget or capacity cap is reached. The budget is split into different 'Pots' which different technologies can bid into, although these have varied by auction.

Bids cannot be above a maximum "Administrative Strike Price" set before the auction. To make comparison between years easier, Strike Prices are quoted in 2012 prices, although this changed to 2024 prices for AR7 in 2025. Projects are paid an inflation-adjusted amount linked to the Consumer Price Index (CPI). The projects also set out a delivery year, when the projects is expected to be commissioned, however this may slip for various reasons.

== History ==
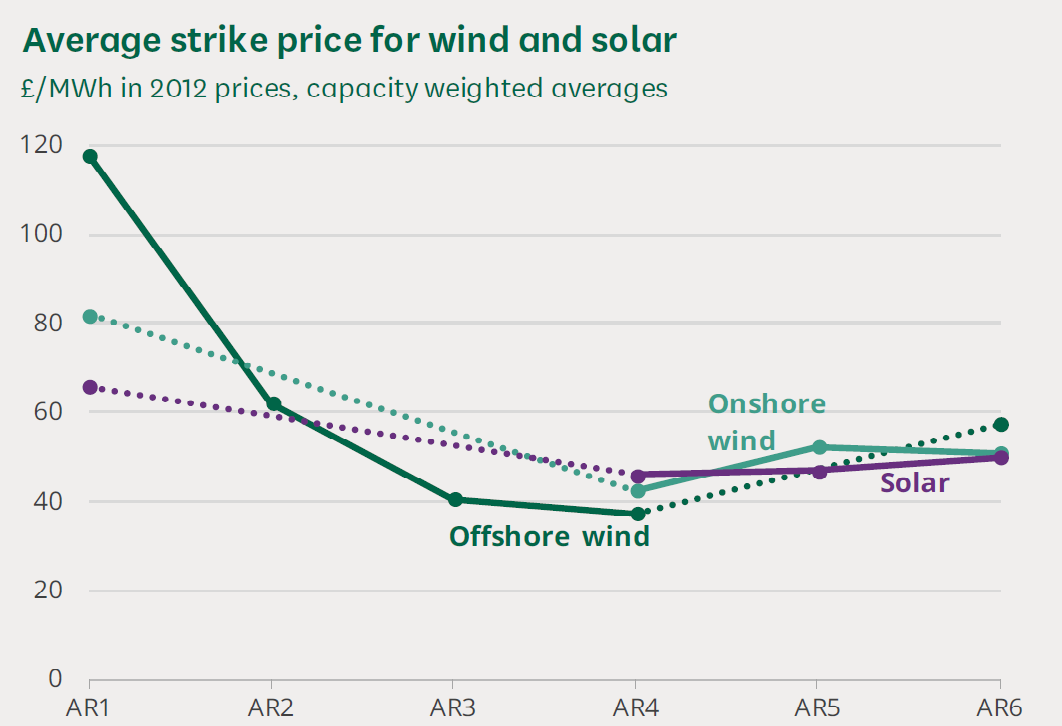
Average strike prices for the bidding rounds bidding rounds AR1 (2014/15) to AR6 (2024)

In December 2010, the Government introduced plans to reform the electricity market. The Electricity Market Reform (EMR) introduced both a capacity market to incentivise reliable generation and Contracts for Difference to provide revenue certainty to developers investing in low carbon and renewable energy, but at a lower cost than the Renewables Obligation.

Prior to the first Allocation Round, there was a mechanism called Final Investment Decision Enabling for Renewables. This awarded CfDs to five offshore wind projects, two biomass conversion projects, and one dedicated biomass with combined heat and power, with a total capacity of almost 4.5 GW.

Separately, the Government also awarded a CfD to Hinkley Point C nuclear power station, set at £92.50/MWh for a 35 year period. This is 20 years longer than other CfD contracts. See §Cost to consumers of the Hinkley Point C article for further discussion on the costs.

Results of the first three auctions were announced in February 2015, September 2017, and October 2019. Starting with AR4 in 2022, subsequent auctions have been on an annual basis.

The 40 gigawatt offshore wind target by 2030 was first set out in the Conservative Party manifesto for the 2019 general election and reaffirmed in the Ten Point Plan in November 2020 and the Net Zero Strategy in October 2021, with the CfD scheme identified as the primary procurement mechanism for delivering that capacity.

In 2024, the Department for Energy Security and Net Zero (DESNZ) consulted on proposed updates to the CfD starting in AR7. Two main changes to the scheme were published in October. Firstly, Adding support for repowering of onshore wind projects after 25 years of commercial operation. Support for repowering other technologies may be added in future. Secondly, extending the phased approach for fixed offshore wind projects to floating, allowing them to be built in up-to three phases to reduce construction risk.

The Clean Power 2030 Action Plan, published by DESNZ in December 2024, indicated further targeted reforms would be implemented before the AR7 auction, subject to further consultation. This includes reviewing the budgeting parameters for fixed offshore wind, and relaxing the eligibility criteria of requiring full planning permission for fixed offshore wind projects.

In November 2024, the Clean Industry Bonus (CIB) was launched. This provides additional CfD support to offshore wind projects (both fixed and floating) that invest in more sustainable supply chains. However, to be applicable for AR7, offshore wind projects need a CIB. It will have a budget of £27m per GW of capacity in AR7, and the application process will run from 13 to 19 February 2025. The CIB was initially introduced as Sustainable Industry Rewards, but was later renamed.

== Mechanism and structure ==
=== Contract structure ===
The UK's Contracts for Difference operate as two-way financial contracts between electricity generators and the Low Carbon Contracts Company, where payments flow in both directions depending on market conditions relative to a predetermined strike price. Strike prices are determined through competitive allocation rounds or administrative processes, with successful bidders securing long-term price certainty for their renewable energy projects. The reference price represents the average wholesale electricity market price over specific periods, calculated using day-ahead and within-day market data from power exchanges. Settlement occurs monthly through a systematic process where the Low Carbon Contracts Company calculates difference payments based on actual generation volumes and the gap between strike and reference prices.

Strike prices function as guaranteed minimum prices per megawatt-hour that generators receive for their electricity output, providing investment certainty for low-carbon generation projects. Reference prices serve as market benchmarks calculated from wholesale electricity prices, typically using a volume-weighted average of trading prices across multiple market timeframes. Difference payments flow from the Low Carbon Contracts Company to generators when market prices fall below strike prices, funded through consumer levies collected by electricity suppliers. Negative payments require generators to return money to the Low Carbon Contracts Company when market prices exceed strike prices, ensuring consumers benefit from higher wholesale electricity values.

=== Contract terms ===
Contracts for Difference typically run for fifteen-year periods from commercial operation dates, providing long-term revenue certainty that enables project financing for capital-intensive renewable energy infrastructure. Generation capacity requirements specify minimum and maximum project sizes eligible for support, with different thresholds applying to various technologies such as offshore wind and solar photovoltaic systems. Performance obligations include availability requirements and penalties for underperformance, ensuring generators maintain operational standards and deliver contracted electricity volumes. Termination conditions cover circumstances including breach of contract terms, failure to meet construction milestones, and changes in project ownership or control structure.

== Extension to other technologies ==
Beyond the standard electricity allocation rounds, the UK government developed CfD-based frameworks for two additional low-carbon technologies.

=== Hydrogen production ===
A CfD-based support mechanism for low-carbon hydrogen production was introduced through the Hydrogen Production Business Model (HPBM), announced in the UK Hydrogen Strategy in August 2021. The HPBM operates similarly to the electricity CfD, covering the difference between a hydrogen-specific strike price – representing the cost of production – and a reference price based on the market value of hydrogen. The first hydrogen allocation round (HAR1), restricted to electrolytic hydrogen projects, opened in July 2022 targeting 250 MW of production capacity, with 11 successful applicants totalling 125 MW announced in December 2023. The HPBM is administered by the Low Carbon Contracts Company, consistent with the electricity CfD framework.

=== Carbon capture and storage ===
A separate CfD-based contractual framework for power generation equipped with carbon capture and storage technology – the Dispatchable Power Agreement (DPA) — was developed based on Contracts for Difference Allocation Round 4 standard terms, adapted for gas-fired generation with carbon capture. For industrial emitters, the Industrial Carbon Capture (ICC) Contract – also structured on a CfD framework – provides revenue support per tonne of captured CO₂, with the Low Carbon Contracts Company designated as the contract counterparty in August 2024. These mechanisms are distinct from the standard electricity CfD allocation rounds and are not awarded through the same competitive auction process.

== Allocation Rounds ==
=== AR1 (2014/15) ===
The first Allocation Round auction started in October 2014, with results announced on 19 February 2015. The maximum prices are given in the first table below. A total of 2.1 GW of contracts were awarded, primarily for two offshore wind projects, the 714 MW East Anglia 1 and the 448 MW Neart Na Gaoithe, plus 15 smaller onshore wind projects.

Administrative Strike Prices for AR1 by technology and delivery year (£_{2012}/MWh)
Pot/Technology	2014/15	2015/16	2016/17	2017/18	2018/19
Pot 1 (established)
Onshore Wind (>5 MW)	95	95	95	90	90
Solar photovoltaic (>5 MW)	120	120	115	110	100
Energy from Waste (with CHP)	80	80	80	80	80
Hydro (>5 MW and <50 MW)	100	100	100	100	100
Landfill gas	55	55	55	55	55
Sewage gas	75	75	75	75	75
Pot 2 (less established)
Offshore wind	155	155	150	140	140
Tidal stream	305	305	305	305	305
Wave	305	305	305	305	305
Advanced Conversion Technologies (with or without CHP)	155	155	150	140	140
Anaerobic digestion (with or without CHP) (>5 MW)	150	150	150	140	140
Dedicated biomass (with CHP)	125	125	125	125	125
Geothermal (with or without CHP)	145	145	145	140	140
Pot 3
Biomass conversion	105	105	105	105	105

Results for AR1 by technology and delivery year
Pot/Technology	Capacity (MW)				№ of projects	Strike Price (£_{2012}/MWh)			
Pot/Technology	2015/16	2016/17	2017/18	2018/19	№ of projects	2015/16	2016/17	2017/18	2018/19
Pot 1 (established)
Onshore Wind (>5 MW)	—	45	77.5	626.05	15	—	79.23	79.99	82.50
Solar photovoltaic (>5 MW)	32.88	38.67	—	—	5	50.00	79.23	—	—
Energy from Waste (with CHP)	—	—	—	94.75	2	—	—	—	80.00
Pot 2 (less established)
Offshore wind	—	—	714	448	2	—	—	119.89	114.39
Advanced Conversion Technologies	—	—	36	26	3	—	—	119.89	114.39
Total	32.88	83.67	827.50	1194.80	27	—	—	—	—

=== AR2 (2017) ===
The second round ran from April to September 2017. As announced in the 2016 budget, no funding was allocated in Pot 1 for the more established technologies of onshore wind, solar PV, hydro, energy from waste with CHP, landfill gas, and sewage gas. Instead, a Pot 2 budget of £290m for less established technologies, of which offshore wind was expected to form the majority. Nearly 3.2 GW of contracts were awarded for three offshore wind farms: Triton Knoll (860 MW), Hornsea Project 2 (1386 MW), and Moray Offshore Windfarm (East) (950 MW). Several smaller projects for advanced conversion technologies and dedicated biomass with CHP were also funded.

Parameters and results for AR2 by technology and delivery year
Pot/Technology	ASP (£_{2012}/MWh)		Capacity (MW)		№ of projects	SP (£_{2012}/MWh)	
Pot/Technology	2021/22	2022/23	2021/22	2022/23	№ of projects	2021/22	2022/23
Pot 2 (less established)
Offshore wind	105	100	860	2336	3	74.75	57.50
ACT (standard or advanced; with or without CHP)	125	115	56.31	8	6	74.75	40.00
Anaerobic digestion (with or without CHP; >5MW)	140	135	—	—	—	—	—
Dedicated biomass (with CHP)	115	115	85.64	—	2	74.75	—
Wave	310	300	—	—	—	—	—
Tidal stream	300	295	—	—	—	—	—
Total	—	—	1001.95	2344	11	—	—

=== AR3 (2019) ===
The auction process for AR3 took place between May and September 2019, with results announced in October. Of the £265m annual budget, £200m was for offshore wind, £24m for floating offshore wind, and £10m for onshore wind, with the remaining £31m for other less established technologies including (onshore) remote island wind. Floating offshore wind received a dedicated ring-fenced budget for the first time in AR3, reflecting the higher development costs of projects in deeper waters where fixed foundations are not viable. The first CfD for a floating offshore wind project was awarded in AR4 to Hexicon AB for its 32 MW TwinHub project. AR3 delivered record low prices for offshore wind, with contracts to deliver in 2023/24 came in at £39.650/MWh and those delivering in 2024/25 at £41.611/MWh.

Parameters and results for AR3 by technology and delivery year
Pot/Technology	ASP (£_{2012}/MWh)		Capacity (MW)		№ of projects	SP (£_{2012}/MWh)	
Pot/Technology	2023/24	2024/25	2023/24	2024/25	№ of projects	2023/24	2024/25
Pot 2 (less established)
Advanced Conversion Technologies	113	111	27.5	6.1	2	39.65	41.611
Anaerobic digestion (>5 MW)	122	121	—	—	—	—	—
Dedicated biomass with CHP	121	121	—	—	—	—	—
Geothermal	129	127	—	—	—	—	—
Offshore wind	56	53	1212	2854	6	39.65	41.611
Remote island wind (>5 MW)	82	82	225.72	49.5	4	39.65	41.611
Tidal stream	225	217	—	—	—	—	—
Wave	281	268	—	—	—	—	—
Total	—	—	2865.22	2909.6	12	—	—

=== AR4 (2021/22) ===
The auction for AR4 took place between December 2021 and July 2022, and re-introduced Pot 1 for established technologies. Of the total £285m budget, a £20m ringfence was set aside for tidal stream projects in Pot 2, and for the first time four contracts totalling just over 40 MW were awarded CfDs, MeyGen, Magallanes Renovables, and two for Orbital Marine Power. The first contract for a floating offshore wind turbine was also awarded, to Hexicon AB for their 32 MW TwinHub project.

Parameters and results for AR4 by technology and delivery year
Pot/Technology	ASP (£_{2012}/MWh)	Capacity (MW)				№ of projects	SP (£_{2012}/MWh)			
Pot/Technology	All delivery years	2023/24	2024/25	2025/26	2026/27	№ of projects	2023/24	2024/25	2025/26	2026/27
Pot 1 (established)
Solar PV (>5 MW)	47	251.38	1958.03	—	—	66	45.99	45.99	—	—
Onshore Wind (>5 MW)	53	—	887.96	—	—	10	—	42.47	—	—
Energy from waste (with CHP)	121	—	30	—	—	1	—	45.99	—	—
Pot 2 (less established)
Tidal stream	211	—	—	5.62	35.2	4	—	—	178.54	178.54
Floating offshore wind	122	—	—	—	32	1	—	—	—	87.30
Remote Island Wind (RIW)	62	—	—	—	597.6	6	—	—	—	46.39
Offshore Wind	46	—	—	—	6994.34	5	—	—	—	37.35
Total	—	251.38	2875.99	5.62	7659.14	93	—	—	—	—

=== AR5 (2023) ===
The auction for AR5 took place between March and September 2023. The available budget was £170 million for Pot 1 (established technologies) and £35 million for Pot 2 (emerging technologies) including a minimum £10m ringfence for tidal stream. Despite warnings from industry before the auction, there were no bids from offshore wind projects as the Administrative Strike Price was seen to be to low to cover the increases in supply chain and cost of capital.

Parameters and results for AR5 by technology and delivery year
Pot/Technology	ASP (£_{2012}/MWh)	Capacity (MW)			№ of projects	SP (£_{2012}/MWh)
Pot/Technology	All delivery years	2025/26	2026/27	2027/28	№ of projects	All delivery years
Pot 1 (established)
Energy from waste (with CHP)	116	—	—	—	—	—
Hydro (>5MW and <50MW)	89	—	—	—	—	—
Landfill gas	62	—	—	—	—	—
Offshore wind	44	—	—	—	—	—
Onshore wind (>5 MW)	53	31.1	204.4	1245.24	24	52.29
Remote island wind (>5 MW))	53	—	—	223.6	1	52.29
Sewage gas	148	—	—	—	—	—
Solar PV (>5 MW)	47	393.96	150.74	1382.98	56	47.00
Pot 2 (less established)
Advanced Conversion Technologies	182	—	—	—	—	—
Anaerobic digestion (>5 MW)	136	—	—	—	—	—
Dedicated biomass with CHP	162	—	—	—	—	—
Floating offshore wind	116	—	—	—	—	—
Geothermal	119	—	7	5	3	119.00
Tidal stream	202	—	4.5	48.54	11	198.00
Wave	245	—	—	—	—	—
Total	—	425.06	366.64	2905.36	95	—

=== AR6 (2024) ===
The auction for AR6 took place between March and September 2024. The budget was initially set at just over £1bn. Following the election, at the end of July, the budget for AR6 was increased by 50% to £1.555bn. The budget was split into three pots by technology:

- Pot 1 for established technologies, initially £120m, increased to £185m,
- Pot 2 for emerging technologies, initially £105m, increased to £270m (again including a ringfence for tidal stream, of £10m then £15m)
- Pot 3 for offshore wind, initially £800m, increased to £1.1bn.

The Administrative Strike Prices were significantly increased from AR5. The Contracts for Difference Allocation 6 results were announced on 3 September 2024, with 131 projects being awarded contracts.

Parameters and results for AR6 by technology and delivery year
Pot/Technology	ASP (£_{2012}/MWh)	Capacity (MW)			№ of projects	SP (£_{2012}/MWh)
Pot/Technology	All delivery years	2026/27	2027/28	2028/29	№ of projects	All delivery years
Pot 1 (established)
Energy from waste (with CHP)	181	—	—	—	—	—
Hydro (>5MW and <50MW)	102	—	—	—	—	—
Landfill gas	69	—	—	—	—	—
Onshore wind (>5 MW)	64	272.58	717.79	—	22	50.90
Remote island wind (>5 MW))	64	—	—	—	—	—
Sewage gas	162	—	—	—	—	—
Solar PV (>5 MW)	61	1091.54	2196.77	—	93	50.07
Pot 2 (less established)
Advanced Conversion Technologies	210	—	—	—	—	—
Anaerobic digestion (>5 MW)	144	—	—	—	—	—
Dedicated biomass with CHP	179	—	—	—	—	—
Floating offshore wind	176	—	—	400	1	139.93
Geothermal	157	—	—	—	—	—
Tidal stream	261	—	10	18	6	172.00
Wave	257	—	—	—	—	—
Pot 3 (offshore wind)
Offshore wind	73	—	—	3363.07	2	58.87
Offshore wind permitted reduction*	n/a	—	1578.51	—	7	54.23
Total	—	1364.12	4503.07	3781.07	131	—

* offshore wind permitted reduction refers to projects that had a previously secured CfD, but have now been awarded a CfD at a higher price. The original contract allowed for up to 25% of the capacity to be withdrawn.

=== AR7 and AR7a (2025/26) ===
Several changes were announced for AR7. Firstly it ran as two separate auctions, AR7 for offshore wind technologies, followed by AR7a for other technologies. Perhaps the most significant change is that the CfD contract length was increased from 15 to 20 years for wind and solar bids, which was expected to lower the price of the winning bids. Also bids for fixed offshore wind projects would be accepted without full planning consent, provided a Development Consent Order application was accepted at least twelve months previously. Onshore wind projects would be eligible for re-powering with new turbines, provided they were originally commissioned over 25 years prior to the target commissioning of the upgraded farm. In October 2025, the budgets for pots 3 and 4, fixed and floating offshore wind respectively were set at £900m and £180m in 2024 prices. Maxima of 30 GW each for Scottish and non-Scottish project was applied to pot 3 for technical reasons. In December 2025, the budgets for pots 1 and 2, established and less established technologies were set at £295m and £15m respectively.

The AR7 auction bids were to be submitted in November 2025, with results announced in January 2026. AR7a followed, with bids submitted in January 2026 and results announced in February 2026. Prior to this, the Clean Industry Bonus applications took place in February 2025.

On 14 January 2026, the results of AR7 were announced, with a unprecedented 8.4 GW awarded contracts. Fixed offshore wind was awarded a fixed "strike price" of around £91/MWh, which is more than the previous round, but significantly cheaper than the first round. The auction budget was significantly increased from £0.9bn to £1.79bn to allow for more capacity which is expected to offer value for households. Independent research by Aurora Energy Research and Baringa suggests that strike prices below around £94/MWh would reduce bill-payer costs compared to gas generation.

Following this the results for other technologies in Pots 1 and 2 were announced on 10 February. This included a record amount of Solar PV, plus more onshore wind and a small amount of tidal stream. The total awarded was just over 6.2 GW, which combined with the previous month's announcement, gives the largest auction to date of 14.7 GW. Once built, this would be sufficient to provide the electricity needs for around 16 million UK homes. Adjusted for inflation, the prices are slightly higher than the lowest prices in 2022; onshore wind up 22% and solar up 1.8%. This represents a "new normal", according to Simon Virley, head of energy and natural resources at KPMG UK, but these are still the cheapest large-scale renewable energy technologies. This should also insulate consumers from future changes in gas prices.

Parameters and results for AR7 and AR7a by technology
Pot/Technology	ASP (£_{2024}/MWh)	Capacity (MW)				№ of projects	SP (£_{2024}/MWh)
Pot/Technology	All delivery years	2027/28	2028/29	2029/30	2030/31	№ of projects	All delivery years
Pot 1 (established)
Energy from waste (with CHP)	287	—	—	—	—	—	—
Hydro (>5MW and <50MW)	168	—	—	—	—	—	—
Landfill gas	94	—	—	—	—	—	—
Onshore wind (>5 MW)	92	625.82	680.36	—	—	28	72.24
Remote island wind (>5 MW))	92	—	—	—	—	—	—
Sewage gas	228	—	—	—	—	—	—
Solar PV (>5 MW)	75	1870.58	3034.43	—	—	157	65.23
Pot 2 (less established)
Advanced Conversion Technologies	307	—	—	—	—	—	—
Anaerobic digestion (>5 MW)	195	—	—	—	—	—	—
Dedicated biomass with CHP	238	—	—	—	—	—	—
Geothermal	219	—	—	—	—	—	—
Tidal stream	371	—	8.50	12.40	—	4	265.00
Wave	386	—	—	—	—	—	—
Pot 3
Offshore wind	113	—	1710	1380	3775	9	91.20
Offshore wind - Scotland	113	—	—	—	1380	1	89.49
Pot 4
Floating offshore wind	271	—	—	192.5	—	2	216.49

=== AR8 (2026/27) ===
Applications for the eighth Allocation Round are from 20 July to 7 August 2026, with results expected by February 2027. The ASP in AR8 remains the same as AR7, but the number of technology Pots has increased still further to 5. A new technology category of "Other Deepwater Offshore Wind" (ODOW) has been introduced for novel foundations in deeper water, but that don't float. Several changes have also been made to improve the chances of projects being built and overall value to consumers. The budgets for Pots 1–4 will be set after the bids have been submitted, allowing the best value technologies to be selected. Construction dates, installed capacity and connection requirements have also been tweaked.

Parameters for AR8 by technology
Pot/Technology	ASP (£_{2024}/MWh)
Pot/Technology	All delivery years
Pot 1	
Solar PV (>5 MW)	75
Pot 2	
Onshore wind (>5 MW)	92
Remote island wind (>5 MW))	92
Pot 3	
Offshore wind	113
Offshore wind - Scotland	113
Pot 4	
Floating offshore wind	271
Other Deepwater Offshore Wind	271
Pot 5	
Advanced Conversion Technologies	307
Anaerobic digestion (>5 MW)	195
Dedicated biomass with CHP	238
Energy from waste (with CHP)	287
Geothermal	219
Hydro (>5MW and <50MW)	168
Landfill gas	94
Sewage gas	228
Tidal stream	371
Wave	386

== Generating capacity awarded in all auctions ==
The following table lists the total capacity awarded in all auctions by technology. Note that the numbers may not sum exactly due to rounding. Some projects awarded a contract have since been cancelled, or did not take up the contract.

Capacity awarded (MW) by technology and Allocation Round (n/a signifies technology was not eligible to bid into that auction)
Round	Nuclear	Solar PV	Onshore wind	Remote island wind	Offshore wind	Floating offshore wind	Tidal Stream	Biomass conversion	Dedicated biomass with CHP	Energy from waste with CHP	Advanced Conversion Technology	Geothermal	Total
Pre-AR1	3,277	—	—	n/a	3,101	—	—	1,052	299	—	—	—	7,729
AR1	n/a	72	749	n/a	1,162	—	—	n/a	—	95	62	—	2,140
AR2	n/a	n/a	n/a	n/a	3,196	—	—	n/a	86	—	64	—	3,346
AR3	n/a	—	—	275	5,466	—	—	n/a	—	—	34	—	5,775
AR4	n/a	2,209	888	598	6,994	32	41	n/a	—	30	—	—	10,792
AR5	n/a	1,928	1481	224	—	—	53	n/a	—	—	—	12	3,698
AR6	n/a	3,288	990	—	3,363	400	28	—	—	—	—	—	9,648
AR7	n/a	4,905	1,306	—	8,245	192.5	21	—	—	—	—	—	14,669.5
Total	3,277	12,402	5,414	1,096	31,527	643.5	143	1,052	385	125	160	12	57,797.5

== See also ==
- Energy policy of the United Kingdom
- Feed-in tariffs in the United Kingdom
- Renewables Obligation (United Kingdom)
