= Energy in the Faroe Islands =

Energy in the Faroe Islands is produced primarily from imported fossil fuels, with further contributions from hydro and wind power. Oil products are the main energy source, mainly consumed by fishing vessels and sea transport. Electricity is produced by oil, hydropower and wind farms, mainly by SEV, which is owned by all the municipalities of the Faroe Islands. The Faroe Islands are not connected by power lines with continental Europe, and thus the archipelago cannot import or export electricity.

== Overview ==
Per capita annual consumption of primary energy in the Faroe Islands was 67 MWh in 2011, almost 60% above the comparable consumption in continental Denmark.

== Electricity ==
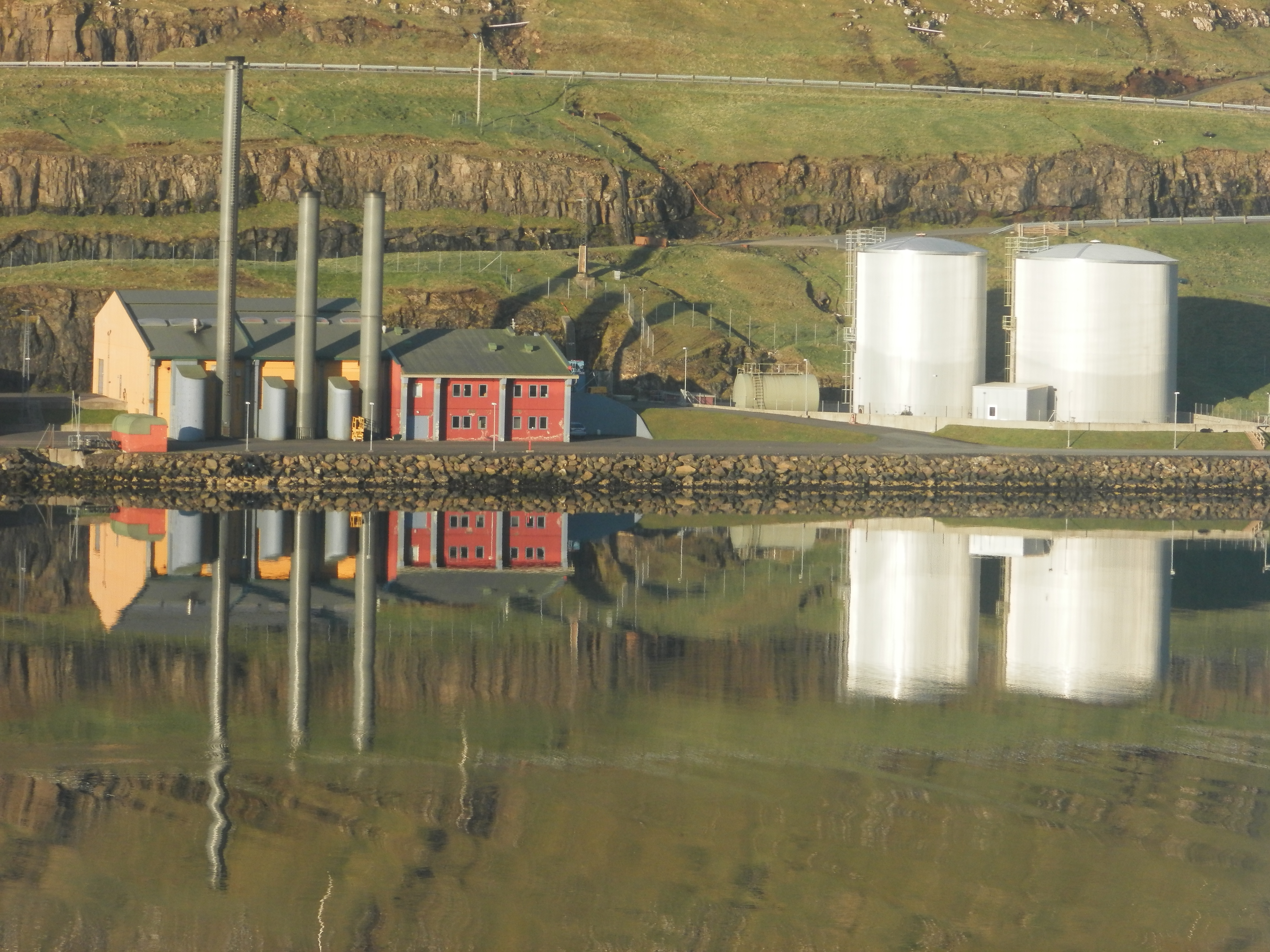
The 13 MW Vágsverkið SEV oil powerplant in Vágur (2013)

After taking a dip in the early 1990s the electricity production in the Faroe Islands has steadily been on the rise since then, going from 174 GWh in 1995 to 434 GWh in 2022, mostly from oil and hydropower. The energy sector employed 154 people or 0.6% of the islands' total workforce as of November 2015.

The islands have 4 diesel plants (around 100 MW and supplying district heating), 6 hydroelectric plants at 37 MW, and 43 MW in several wind power plants with a capacity factor above 40%. In 2022, the main grid had 50 days where more than 80% of the power was renewable.

The municipality-owned company SEV is the main electricity supplier in the Faroe Islands with 90% of the total production, and private producers supplying the rest.

=== Windpower and batteries ===
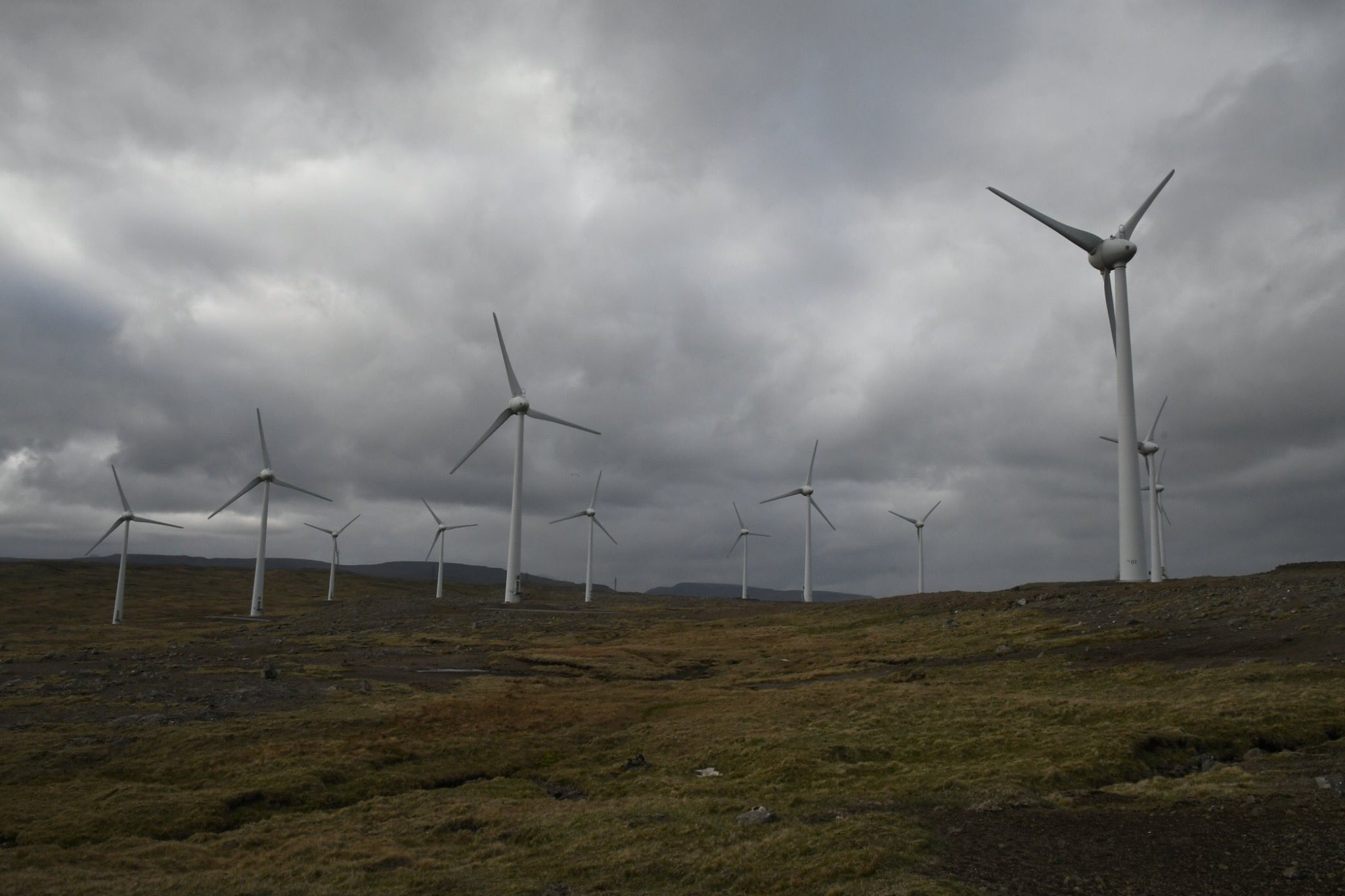
The 12 MW Húsahagi wind farm in 2019

Wind power was introduced in 1993, producing as little as 423 MWh at first, but rising to 90 GWh by 2022. In 2014, the DKK 180 million 12 MW Húsahagi wind farm with Enercon 900 kW turbines became operational near Torshavn and increased wind capacity from 6.6 to 18.6MW; this decreased oil consumption by 8,000 ton (approximately 4M€) per year.

Adjacent to Húsahagi is the 25 MW Gellingakletti wind farm with 6 Vestas 4.2 MW V117 wind turbines, which started in December 2022, producing 100 GWh/year at DKK 0.218 per kWh. The difference between supply and demand was a source of conflict.

Also adjacent to Húsahagi and Gellingakletti is the Flatnahagan wind farm with 6 Enercon turbines, scheduled at 66 GWh per year when ready.

A €2 million 2.3MW 700kWh lithium-ion battery at Húsahagi became operational in 2016, stabilizing the wind power output, and a further 12.5 MWh battery with a 15 MVAr syncron compensator is underway at the Sund powerplant. Wind power is expected to save consumers DKK 57 million.

=== Plans ===
Six Enercon E82/3MW wind turbines (18MW combined) are to be installed at Eiði, at a cost of DKK 0.239 per kWh.

Planners also consider converting the existing hydropower to pumped-storage hydroelectricity, as rain and wind are high in winter and low in summer. Tidal power, offshore wind power and thermal energy storage solutions are also being considered, as the islands have a goal of 100% green electricity production by 2030. This occasionally happens when rain and wind matches demand, and the diesel power plants are turned off.

=== Wave power ===
A wave power project, SeWave, was piloted in the early 2000s. However, this project was abandoned.

=== Transmission ===
The main electricity grid on the Faroe Islands has the highest voltage of 60 kiloVolt, of which there is 90 km overhead wire and 6 km cable. The 20kV system is 460 km and reaches most towns in the main islands, whereas the 10 kV system covers the connected outlying islands, and Torshavn. Due to extreme weather conditions and its lack of interconnections, the Faroe Islands experience one to three total blackouts annually, a ratio higher than that of continental Europe. Most of the powerlines have therefore been buried underground as cables for better protection, improving grid stability. When SEV detects grid issues, automatic demand response at large consumers reduce consumption to increase grid stability.

=== Consumption ===
Demand (and thus, production) is up to 55 MW in 2019 (record was 62 MW in November 2019), up from 40 MW at daytime peak previously (nighttime low is 15 MW).

The islands have 42 thousand vehicles, of which 18 thousand are petrol cars, 14 thousand are diesel cars, and 1,800 electric cars. There are several 50 kW electric vehicle charging stations on the islands, and a few 150 kW chargers.

=== Self-contained islands ===
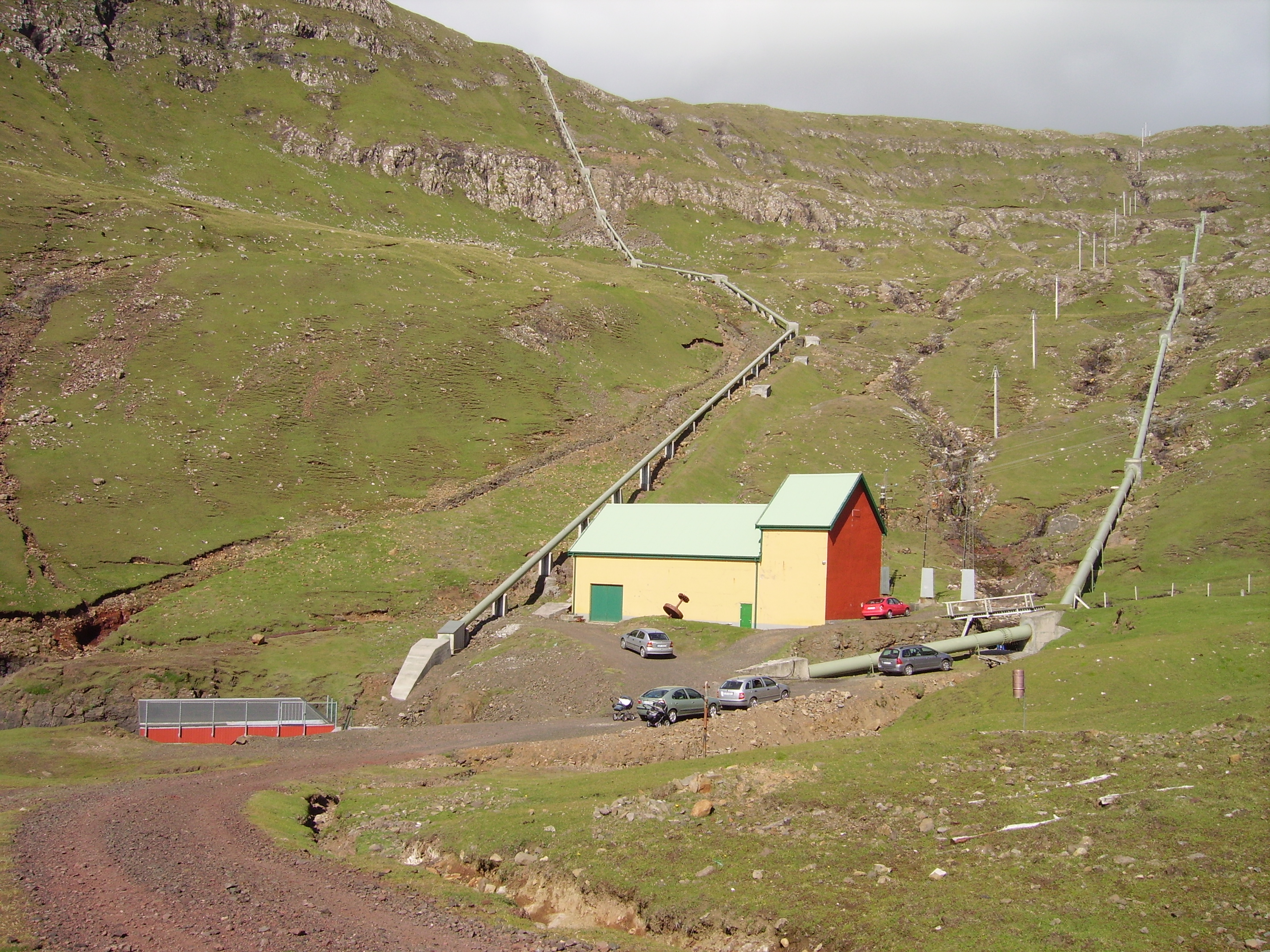
The 3.3 MW hydro Botnur power plant on Suðuroy was built in 1921.

External image
- Sumba solar diagrams

Suðuroy has its own grid with 20 and 10 kV. This grid is powered by the 13 MW diesel at Vágur, the 2 MW diesel at Trongisvágur, 6.3 MW wind at Porkeri and the 3.3 MW hydro Botnur power plant.

The Faroe Islands' first solar park was installed with 250 kW capacity in Sumba in late 2019, expected to produce 160 MWh/year (i.e. a capacity factor of 7.3% and equivalent to 35 tons of oil), from diffuse light for 1,000 hours per year; mainly in the summer when rain and wind are low. For the month of January 2020, the solar plant produced 672 kWh, and 35.8 MWh in June 2023.

Seven Enercon wind turbines at a combined 6.3 MW were installed at Porkeri Mountains in 2020. Production is expected to be 20 GWh per year, reducing oil consumption by 4,300 tonnes. For the month of October 2022, the wind turbines supplied 60% of the power. Combined with the Botni hydroplant, they supplied 84% while the oil motors supplied the remaining 16%. In 2022, the Suðuroy grid had 56 days with 100% renewable power. A syncron compensator started in late 2022, and 6.25 MW / 7.5 MWh grid battery started in early 2023, increasing grid stability and utilisation of wind turbines.

Like Suðuroy, the islands of Fugloy, Hestur, Mykines, Skúvoy and Stóra Dímun are also not part of the main grid or connected to other islands. They are each electrified through their own separate fossil fuel powerplants.

=== Statistics ===
External image
- Diagrams of grid production

In 2020, SEV spent DKK 165 million on fuel oil. In 2018 the main electricity was 352 GWh, with 51.2% from oil engines, 30.7% from hydropower, and 18.1% from wind.

In 2014 50.8% of the electricity production of SEV in the Faroe Islands came from green energy like hydro (mostly Eiði and Vestmanna) and wind, while 49.2% was produced by the thermal power plants, which was 12.4% less than in 2013.

- fossil fuel: 49.2%
- hydro: 39.5%
- wind: 11.3%% (2014)

Total annual production: 305.4 GWh (2014) of which the production of thermal, hydropower and wind power was:

- Thermal: 150,2 GWh
- Hydropower: 120,7 GWh
- Wind: 34,5 GWh

The main source is imported oil, costing DKK 0.70-0.80 per KWh. Wind power costs DKK 0.52/kWh as most of it will go unused until pumped-storage is installed to store it. If all wind power is then used, it would cost DKK 0.23/kWh. Power prices increased from 0.64 per kWh in 2007, to DKK 1.31 per kWh in 2019.

== Oil consumption ==
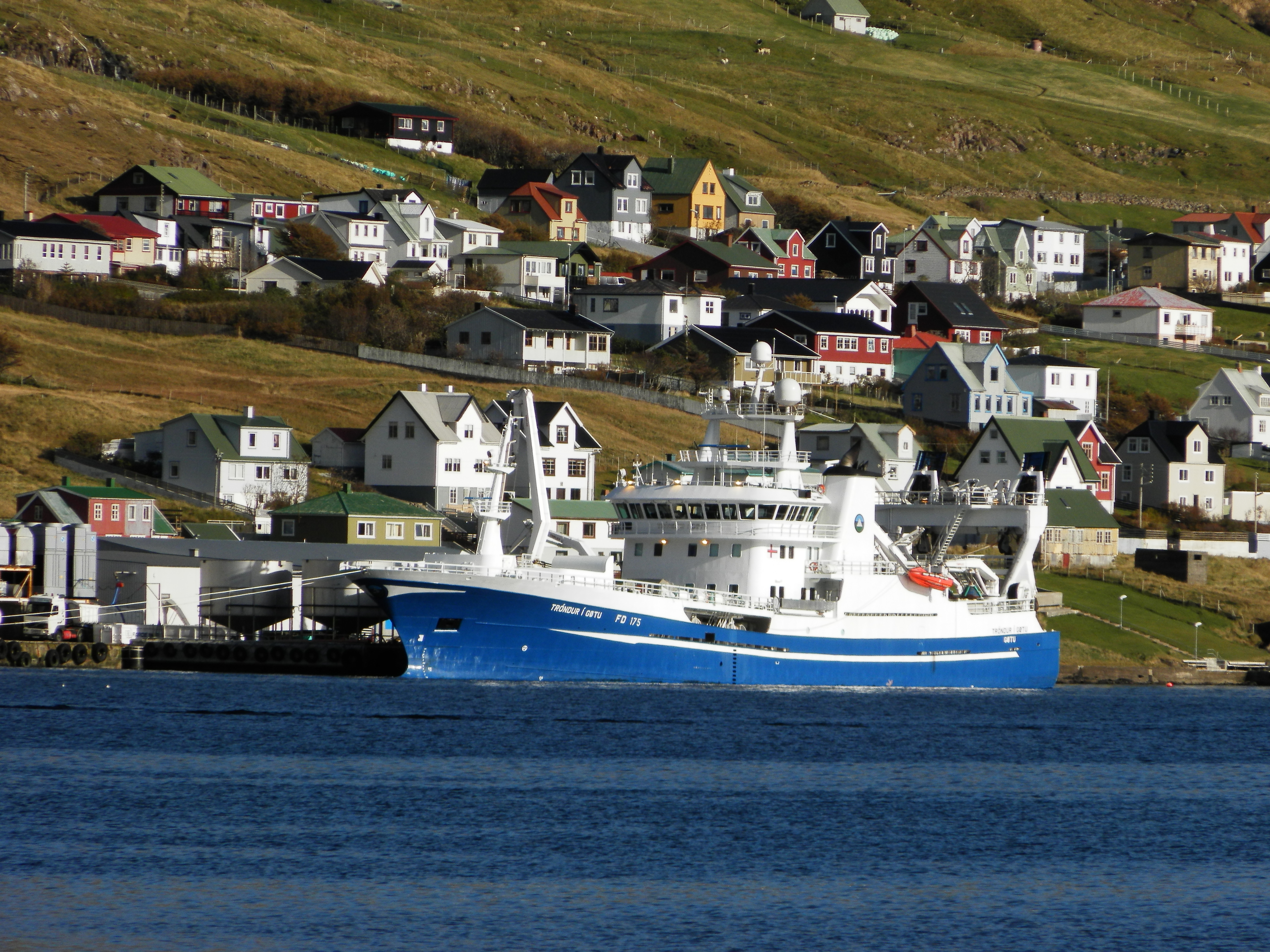
Fishing vessels are the main consumer of oil in the Faroe Islands.

Oil consumption peaked at over 300,000 tonnes in 2020, at a value of DKK 1 billion. Of this, 30% was for fishing vessels. In 2014, 217,547 tonnes of oil products were consumed in the Faroe Islands. Of these, 31.58% was consumed by fishing vessels, 14.73% was used by SEV for electricity production, 23.23% was consumed in air, sea or land transport, 9.6% was used in the industry, and the rest was used by public or private buildings.

Oil and gas exploration has been taking place around the Faroe Islands since 2001, with the expectation that significant oil reserves will be found.

There are coal reserves on Suðuroy, which were considered for energy production. The reserves are between 10 and 15 million tonnes and they could replace oil in the Sund power-station for 100 years.

== Government energy policy ==
The Faroe Islands have set a goal of producing their entire electrical energy needs from renewable energy sources by 2030. Since energy consumption has been rising steadily during the last few decades, the Ministry of Trade and Industry has conducted a study for the future development of electricity production projects. Apart from the development of new hydropower plants and wind farms, the study proposes the investigation of the possibility to produce electricity from LNG and biogas. The University of the Faroe Islands has undertaken research into the feasibility of tidal power at several sites which have a high energy potential, leading the Ministry of Trade and Industry to consider tidal power as a possibility. The privatisation of electricity production was not promoted, although consideration was given to introducing competition and transparency into electricity production.

== See also ==
- Economy of the Faroe Islands
