= Eiði Municipality =

Eiði Municipality Eiðis kommuna (Faroese)
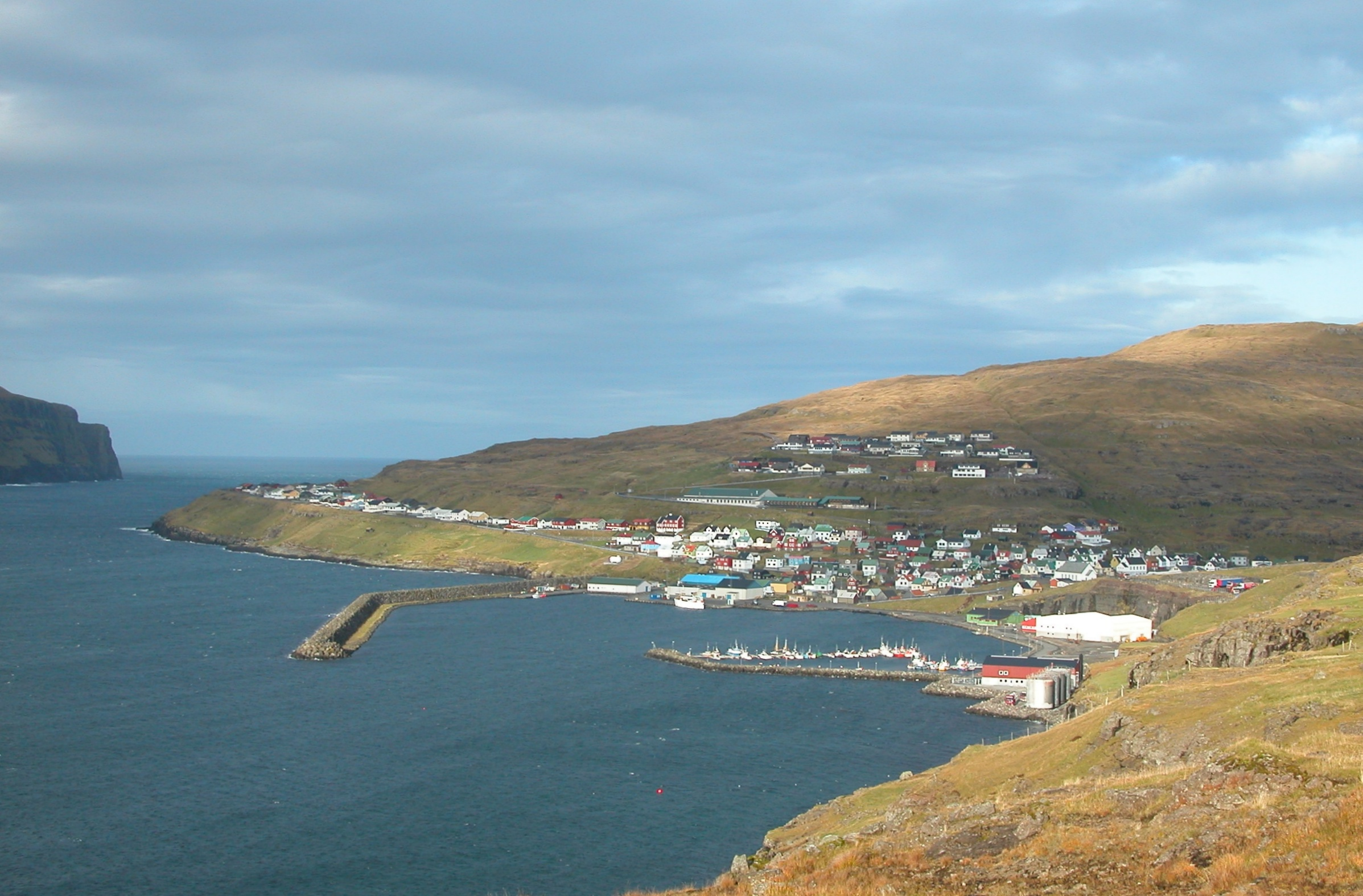
- View of Eiði

- Seal

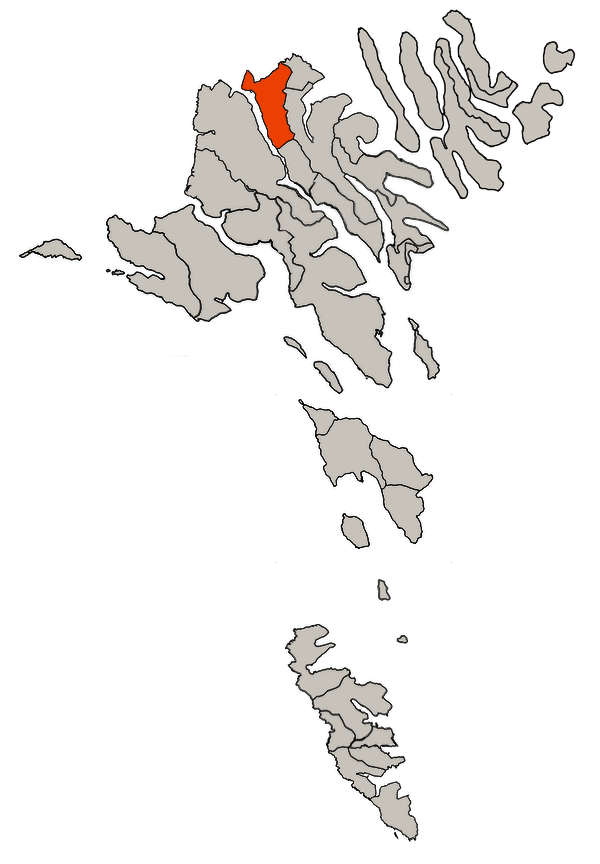
- Coordinates: 62.299167°N 7.090278°W
- State: Denmark
- Constituent country: Faroe Islands
- Region: Eysturoy
- Established: 1894
- Seat: Eiði

Government
  - Mayor: Jógvan í Skorini

Area
  - Total: 37 km^{2} (14 sq mi)

Population (2023)
  - Total: 810
  - Density: 18.57/km^{2} (48.1/sq mi)
- Time zone: UTC±00:00 (WET)
  - Summer (DST): UTC+01:00 (WEST)
- Website: www.eidi.fo

Eiði Municipality (Faroese: Eiðis kommuna) is a municipality of the Faroe Islands. It is part of the Eysturoy region, and consists of a northwesterly part of the Eysturoy island. The municipality borders Runavík Municipality to the east and Sunda Municipality to the south and east. The population of the municipality is 777 ( Sep.2024). Since January 1st 2025 the Mayor of the municipality is Jógvan í Skorini, who was also the mayor in 2013-2020. The municipal council consists of seven members elected every four years.

The municipality contains Lake Eiði, which is situated between Eiði and Ljósá on the northwest side of Eysturoy. The Breiðá River flows nearby. Eiði power plant, the largest hydroelectric power station in the Faroe Islands, lies on the lake. The power plant opened in 1987, and is owned by the power producer and distributor SEV. A 100 metres (330 ft) long pipe, capable of holding some 17,000,000 m³ of water, feeds the plant, running from a tunnel leading up a nearby mountain.

Slættaratindur, the highest mountain in the Faroe Islands, with an elevation of 880 metres (2,890 ft) is located between the villages of Eiði, Gjógv, and Funningur.

== History ==
The village of Eiði is first mentioned in texts in the 14th century, but carbon dating suggests that Norsemen founded the settlement in the 10th century. The area of the modern Eiði Municipality came under Norðoya Prestagjalds Municipality in 1872 where the prestegjeld municipalities were founded. In 1879 the locals of Eiði showed interest in becoming an independent municipality, which happened in 1894. The first mayor of the new municipality became Grækaris Joensen. In 1943 the municipality was divided, with three of the municipality's six villages forming their own municipality: Sunda Municipality. This officially went into effect on 1 January 1944. The borders of the new Eiði Municipality has remained unchanged since then.

== Settlements ==
Eiði Municipality consists of three villages. These villages are listed in the table below, with populations from January 2021.

Eiði	712
Svínáir	44
Ljósá	34

=== Eiði ===
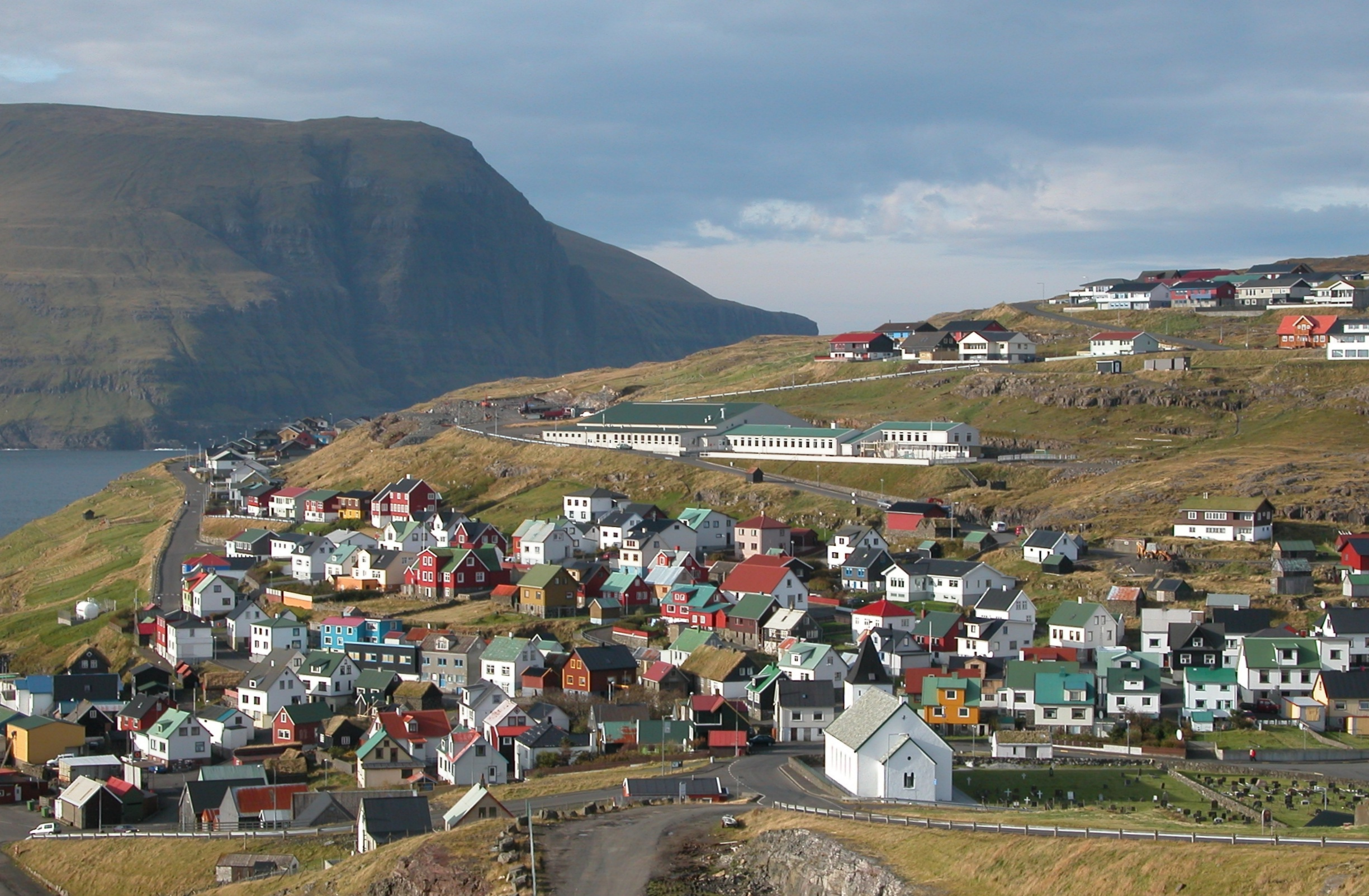
View of Eiði

Eiði is the seat of the municipality, located in the northern part of the municipality, south of the Niðara Vatn lake and north west of Lake Eiði. Eiði borders the Sundini sound to the south. The southern parts of Eiði mainly consists of an industrial fishery harbour. North of the harbour is Eiði Church and the associated cemetery. The central parts of Eiði consists of mainly residential buildings, with a few facilities. Among these facilities is a local history museum and a school. The school was built 1965. North of the village is a discontinued football field, now used by Eiði Camping as camping ground.

Located just east of Eiði is the LORAN-C transmitter Ejde. It was an important station for submarine navigation during the Cold War, and in the 1960s the number of employees at the station were at 32. Today there are 2 employees at the station, and although the American support for the station was stopped in 1994, it is still in use.

== Nature ==
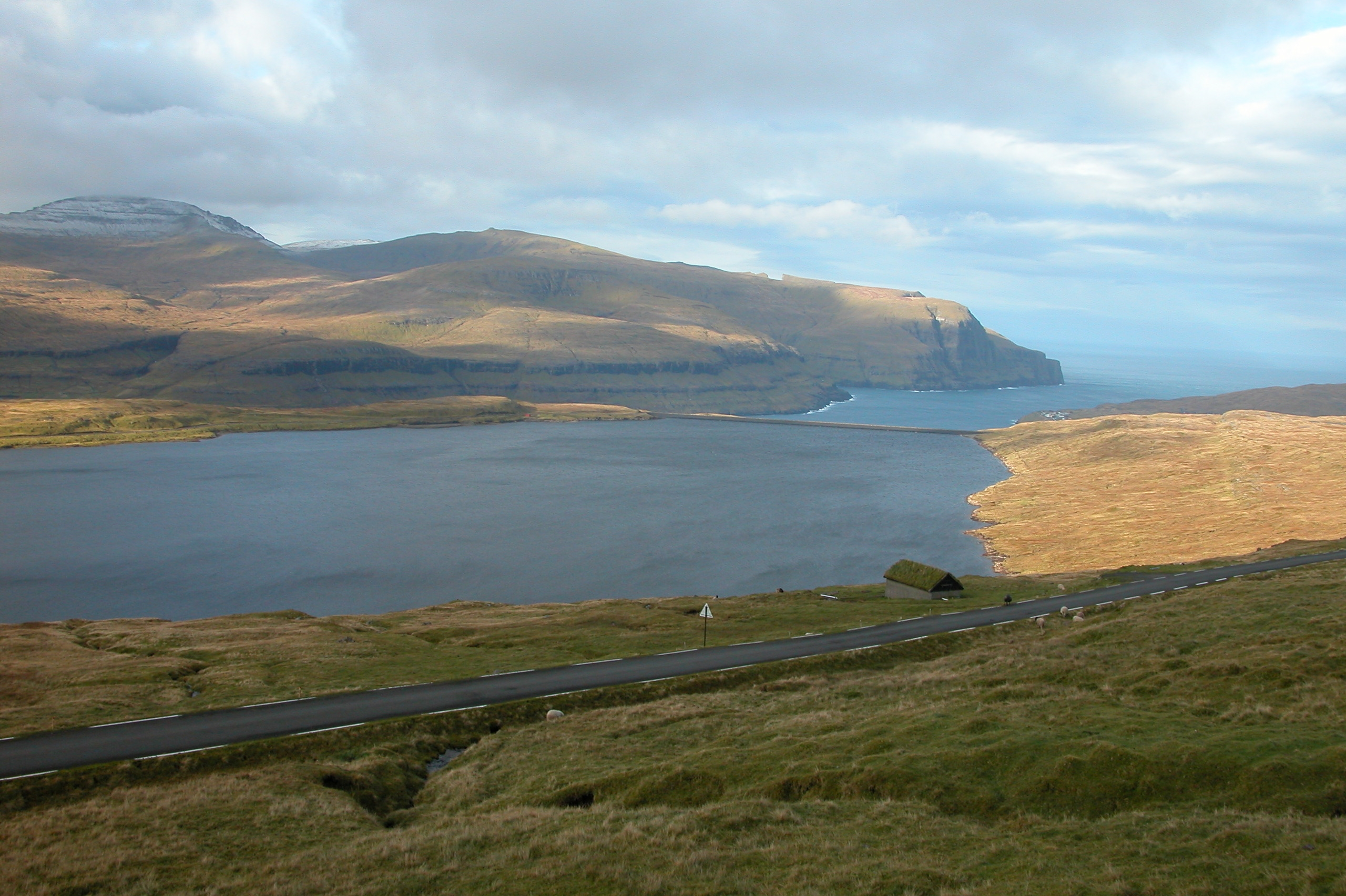
Lake Eiði

Lake Eiði (Faroese: Eiðisvatn) is the fifth largest lake in the Faroe Islands. The Breiðá river goes out from the lake and into the ocean. The lake is a popular fishing spot, home to fish such as sea trout, charr, river trout and rainbow trout. The black-legged kittiwake is common around the lake.

The Slættaratindur is the highest mountain in the Faroe Islands, located east of the village of Eiði. The mountain is 880 meters tall.

== Politics ==
The municipality's municipal council consists of seven municipal councillors, elected every four years. The municipal council has five political committees.

From 1894 and until 1975 the municipal council consisted of five members. Since 1975 it has consisted of seven members.

=== Mayors ===
Since the municipality was founded in 1894, the mayors of Eiði Municipality have been:

#	Mayor	Term
1	Grækaris Joensen	1894—1897
2	Jens Jørgen Kruse	1897—1900
3	Heini Nygaard	1900—1903
4	Sámal Samuelsen	1903—1910
5	Johannes Hans Petersen	1910—1912
6	Christian J. Christiansen	1912—1914
7	Oliver Øster	1914—1918
8	Anthon Ellingsgaard	1918—1922
9	Jóannes Mørkøre	1922—1930
10	Hans Poulsen	1931—1934
11	Óli Joensen	1935—1938
12	Poul Vesturdal	1939—1942
13	Jens Arni Kruse	1943—1943
14	Símun Elias Kristiansen	1944—1946
15	Jóhannes Vesturtún	1947—1950
16	Mourits Olsen	1951—1954

#	Mayor	Term
17	Eivind Kruse	1955—1958
18	Johan Kruse	1959—1962
19	Óli Ellingsgaard	1963—1970
20	Jógvan K. Mørkøre	1971—1976
21	Petur Joensen	1977—1980
22	Rasmus A. Joensen	1981—1984
23	Regin Ellingsgaard	1985—1988
24	Hans J. í Kollsbyrgi	1989—2000
25	Tordur Niclasen	2001—2008
26	Rólant Poulsen	2009—2012
27	Jógvan í Skorini	2013—2020
28	Rógvi Egilstoft	2021—2023
29	Annsy Høghamar	2023-2024
30	Jógvan í Skorini	2025-

== Energy ==
Eiði power plant is a hydroelectric power plant, located at Lake Eiði. It is the largest of is kind on the Faroe Islands. The power plant is owned by SEV. The first turbine of the plant was started on April 28, 1987 and expansions were made in 1997 and 2000.

== Demographics ==
Historical population
Year	Pop.	±%
1945	629	—
1950	591	−6.0%
1955	580	−1.9%
1960	620	+6.9%
1966	587	−5.3%
1970	583	−0.7%
1977	581	−0.3%
1985	620	+6.7%
1990	717	+15.6%
1995	631	−12.0%
2000	687	+8.9%
2005	718	+4.5%
2010	663	−7.7%
2015	686	+3.5%
2020	763	+11.2%
2021	767	+0.5%
Source: Statbank.hagstova.fo

There are 767 people living in Eiði Municipality (2021). 54.63% are men and 45.37% are women.

Below is the age distribution of the municipality.

Age
1. 0–5 (8.21%)
2. 6–17 (15.0%)
3. 18–35 (22.7%)
4. 36–64 (36.4%)
5. 64+ (17.7%)

== Education ==
Eiði School (Faroese: Eiðis skúli) is located in the western part of the village of Eiði. The school goes up to 7th grade, with students transferring to Streymin School (Faroese: Skúlin við Streymin) in Oyrarbakki for 8th, 9th and 10th grade. The municipality also has a kindergarten, which opened in 2008.

== Sights ==
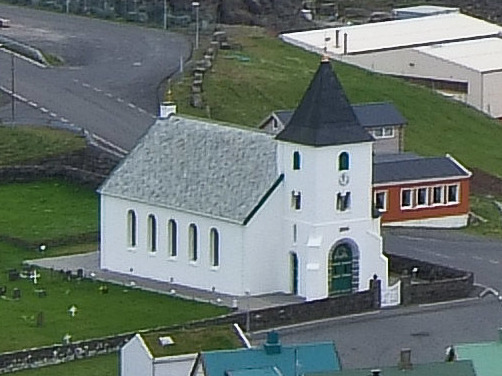
Eiði Church

The municipality's small size means that there are few attractions. The village of Eiði does have a local history museum. This museum is called Látrið, and it is located centrally in Eiði, set in a restored farmhouse from 1840. Also located in Eiði is Eiði Church, located centrally in the village. It was founded on September 18, 1881 and was designed in 1879 by Danish architect Hans Christian Amberg.

== Sport ==
The main football club in Eiði Municipality was Eiðis Bóltfelag, established in 1913, but it merged with Streymur Hvalvik in 1993 to form EB/Streymur. The club's home ground is based in Streymnes.

== Notable residents ==
- Grækaris Joensen (1835 in Eiði — 1897), teacher, politician and the first mayor of the municipality
- Jógvan Poulsen (1854 in Svínáir — 1941), teacher, writer and politician
- Hans Pauli Samuelsen (born 1984 in Haldórsvík), football player
- Virgar Jónsson (born 2006), football player
