= Lake Eiði =

Lake on the island of Eysturoy in the Faroe Islands

- Eiðisvatn (Faroese)
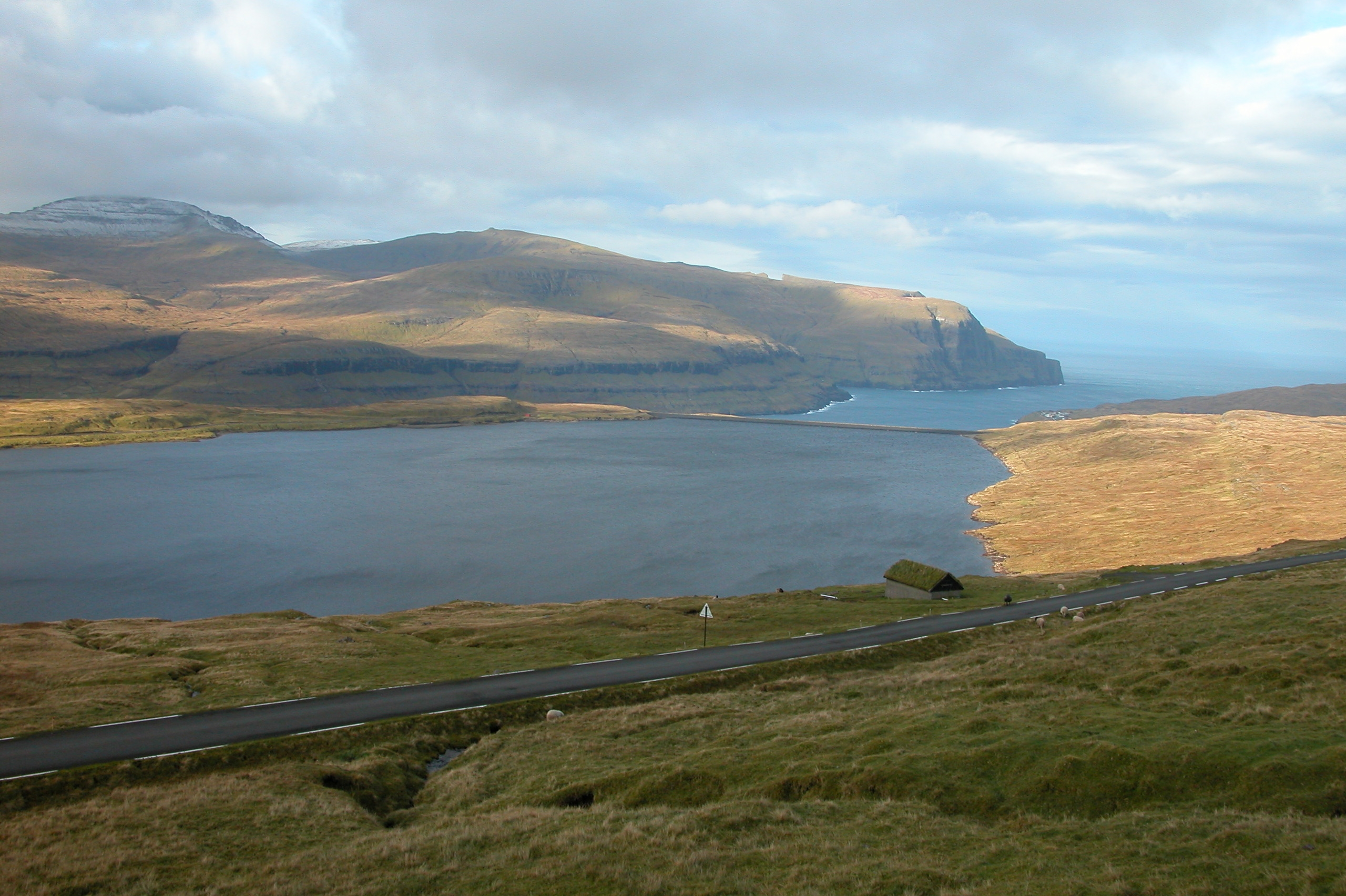
- Lake Eiði

- Location within Denmark Faroe Islands
- Location: Near Eiði, Faroe Islands
- Coordinates: 62°17′4.8948″N 7°3′16.855″W
- Catchment area: 42.6 km^{2} (16.4 sq mi)
- Basin countries: Faroe Islands
- Surface area: 47 ha (120 acres) (natural size)
- Water volume: 17,000,000 m^{3} (14,000 acre⋅ft)
- Surface elevation: 129–149 m (423–489 ft)

Lake Eiði (Faroese: Eiðisvatn) is a lake on the island of Eysturoy in the Faroe Islands.

Lake Eiði is located between the villages of Eiði and Ljósá. It is the fifth-largest natural lake in the Faroe Islands, with a natural size of 47 hectares (120 acres) that has been increased to 1.14 square kilometers (0.44 sq mi). The size of the lake was increased by walls 22 and 13 m high, constructed by the SEV company in connection with the Eiði power plant, which uses the lake as a reservoir. Electricity production was started in 1987. Two tunnels redirect water from adjacent valleys to Eiði.
