= Trevor Whittaker =

Sir Trevor Whittaker is an Irish engineer who is Professor of coastal engineering at Queen's University, Belfast having been awarded a personal chair in 1993. He was elected a Fellow of The Royal Academy of Engineering in 2002. He is specialist adviser to the board of Aquamarine Power, a company formed to commercially develop the Oyster wave energy converter.

In the 1990s, Whittaker managed the team which designed, constructed and operated Britain's first wave power station, located on the Isle of Islay. Prior to decommissioning in 1998, the 75 kW plant was one of only four wave power stations in the world supplying electricity to a national distribution grid. The significance of this work was recognised when the team was presented with The ESSO Energy award in 1994 by The Royal Society. This work led to the construction of the 500 kW Islay LIMPET plant which was commissioned in 2001 and is now being commercially developed.

Whittaker has been a pioneer of wave power engineering since the early 1970s, when he first worked with Allan Wells on the design and delivery of the first Wells Turbine.
