= Wavegen =

Wave energy company

Wavegen Limited
- Company type: Limited
- Industry: Engineering
- Founded: 1990
- Founder: Allan Thomson
- Defunct: 2013
- Headquarters: Inverness, Scotland, United Kingdom
- Key people: Matthew Seed (CEO)
- Products: Limpet wave energy converters
- Parent: Voith Hydro

Wavegen Limited (later Voith Hydro Wavegen Limited) was a wave energy company based in Inverness, Scotland. It was founded in 1990 by Allan Thomson. It was sold to Voith Hydro in 2005, and they closed the company in 2013.

== History ==
In 2000, Wavegen became the first company in the world to connect a commercial scale wave energy device (LIMPET) to the grid on the Scottish island of Islay. The LIMPET (Land Installed Marine Powered Energy Transformer) is a shoreline device which produces power from an oscillating water column.

In May 2005, Wavegen was bought by Voith Hydro, a subsidiary of Voith.

Together with the Faroese power company SEV, Wavegen had planned to develop the SeWave wave energy plant project in Nípanin in the Faroe Islands. It was also the developer of the Siadar Wave Energy Project.

On 17 November 2011, Wavegen put into operation the world's first commercial full life Limpet wave power plant. The 300-kW plant was sold to Ente Vasco de la Energía in Spain.

In March 2013 Voith Hydro decided to close down Wavegen choosing to concentrate on tidal power projects.

== See also ==
- Aquamarine Power
- Oyster wave energy converter
