= 1895 Faroese general election =

Danish territorial election

Partial general elections were held in the Faroe Islands in 1895 to elect nine of the eighteen elected members of the Løgting. The Danish administrator (Amtmaður) and the local dean (Próstur) were also members, with the administrator serving as the speaker.

== Electoral system ==
Members of the Løgting were elected by first-past-the-post voting, with voters having as many votes as there were seats available in their constituency. Nine of the 18 seats were elected every two years. Voting was restricted to men aged 25 or over who met certain tax-paying criteria.

== Results ==
Constituency	Elected members	Notes
Eysturoy	Christian Jacobsen	
Eysturoy	Gregers Joensen	
Eysturoy	Jógvan Poulsen	Re-elected
Eysturoy	Magnus Poulsen	
Norðurstreymoy	Ole Jacobsen	Re-elected
Norðurstreymoy	Søren Emil Müller	Re-elected
Suðurstreymoy	Djóni í Geil	Re-elected
Vágar	Mikkjal Danielsen	Re-elected
Vágar	Daniel Niclasen	Re-elected
Source: Løgting

=== By constituency ===
Norðurstreymoy
Candidate	Votes	%
Ole Jacobsen	69	39.66
Søren Emil Müller	59	33.91
Ole Johannes Olsen	27	15.52
Olaus Johan Michal Johnsen	16	9.20
Jacob Jacobsen	1	0.57
Joen Peter Gergoriussen	1	0.57
Johan Dam	1	0.57
Total	174	100.00
Total votes	84	–
Registered voters/turnout	250	33.60
Source: Løgting

== Aftermath ==
Gregers Joensen died in 1897 and was replaced by Ole Hansen Dahl.
