= 1883 Faroese general election =

Danish territorial election

Partial general elections were held in the Faroe Islands in 1883 to elect nine of the eighteen elected members of the Løgting. The Danish administrator (Amtmaður) and the local dean (Próstur) were also members, with the administrator serving as the speaker.

== Electoral system ==
Members of the Løgting were elected by first-past-the-post voting, with voters having as many votes as there were seats available in their constituency. Nine of the 18 seats were elected every two years. Voting was restricted to men aged 25 or over who met certain tax-paying criteria.

== Results ==
Constituency	Elected members	Notes
Eysturoy	Gregers Joensen	Re-elected
Eysturoy	Johannes Petersen	Re-elected
Eysturoy	Jógvan Poulsen	
Eysturoy	Samuel Jacob Rasmussen	
Norðurstreymoy	Ole Jacobsen	Re-elected
Norðurstreymoy	Ole Jacob Petersen	
Suðurstreymoy	Jacob Jacobsen	
Vágar	Mikkjal Danielsen	Re-elected
Vágar	Zacharias Nielsen	Re-elected
Source: Løgting

=== By constituency ===
Norðurstreymoy
Candidate	Votes	%
Ole Jacobsen	36	46.15
Ole Jacob Petersen	29	37.18
Joen Hansen	6	7.69
Daniel Jacob Jacobsen	3	3.85
Peter Petersen	2	2.56
Hans Joensen	1	1.28
Samuel Jacob Hansen	1	1.28
Total	78	100.00
Total votes	39	–
Registered voters/turnout	230	16.96
Source: Løgting

== Aftermath ==
Ole Jacob Petersen died in 1885. In a by-election held on 29 June Thomas Debes was elected as his replacement with 14 votes to one received by Ivar Petersen Dall.

1885 Norðurstreymoy by-election
Candidate	Votes	%
Thomas Debes	14	93.33
Ivar Petersen Dall	1	6.67
Total	15	100.00
Total votes	15	–
Registered voters/turnout	230	6.52
Source: Løgting
