= Svínáir =

- Village
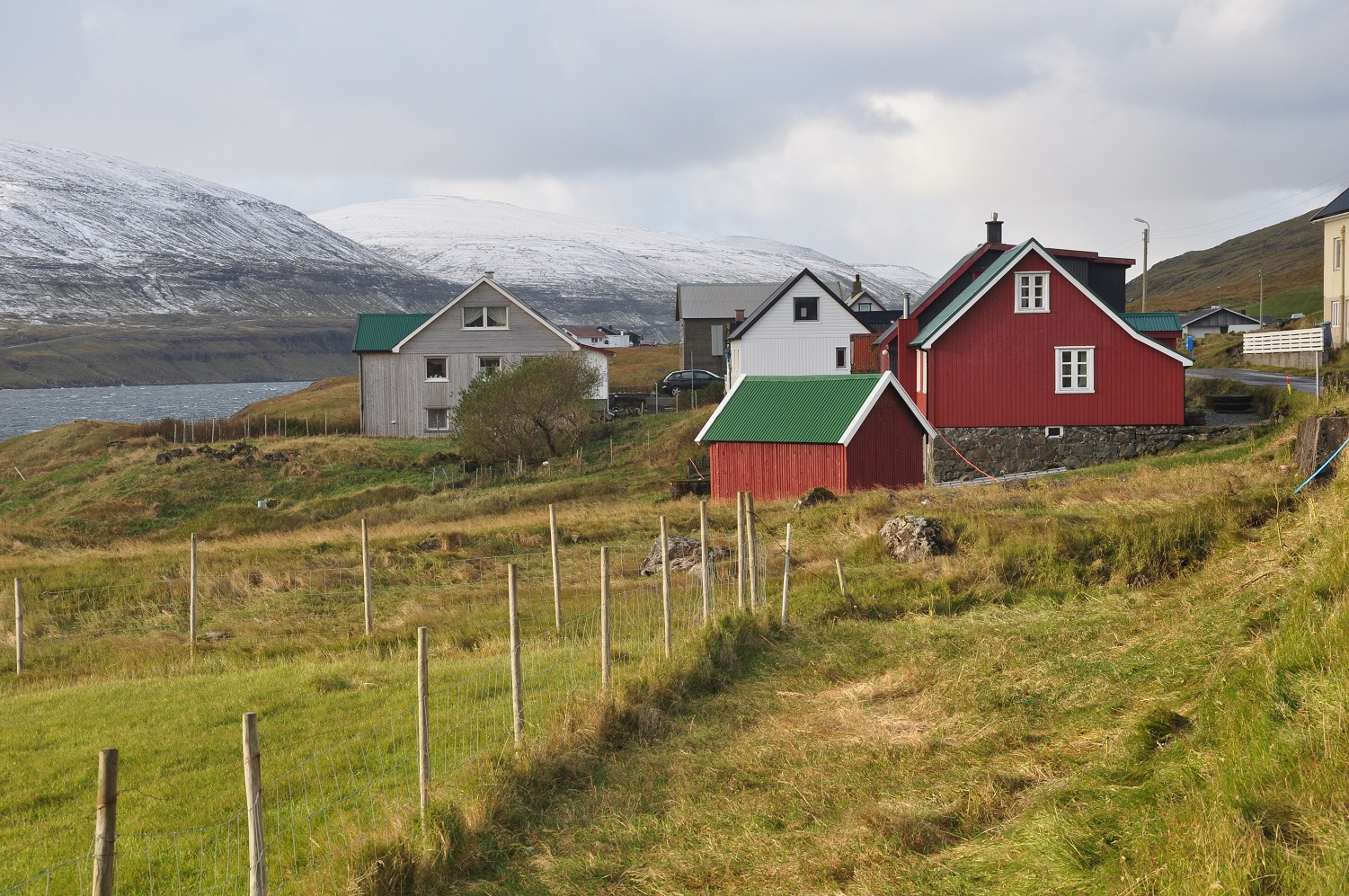
- Svínáir

- Location in the Faroe Islands
- Coordinates: 62°13′46″N 7°1′25″W
- State: Denmark
- Constituent country: Faroe Islands
- Region: Eysturoy
- Municipality: Eiði

Population (September 2025)
  - Total: 41
- Time zone: UTC±00:00 (WET)
  - Summer (DST): UTC+01:00 (WEST)
- Postal code: 465
- Climate: Cfc

Svínáir (Danish: Svinåer) is a village located on Eysturoy in the Faroe Islands, in Eiði Municipality. It is located 4 km north of Ljósá and 6.5 km west of Funningur. It is located 8.5 km south of Eiði, 4.6 km south of Ljósá and 2 km north of Norðskáli.

The village was founded in late 1820s.

== Notable residents ==
- Jógvan Poulsen (1854 — 1941), teacher, writer and politician
