= Artemis Intelligent Power =

Artemis Intelligent Power (AIP) is an engineering and R&D company based in Edinburgh, Scotland. It primarily manufactures hydraulic machines and transmissions that are based on high-speed solenoid valves and digital control technology. The company is noted for developing its digital displacement technology.

== History ==
The company emerged from a University of Edinburgh project initiated in 1994 by Win Rampen and Stephen Salter with a focus on producing high-tech machines to generate renewable energy and reduce fuel consumption of vehicles. The UK Carbon Trust supported the research project splitting off into a fully operational company in its development of its hydraulic transmission system.

AIP stated that its digital displacement hydraulic pump (DDP) technology can deliver greater efficiency and productivity, particularly when applied to off-highway machines. The technology was first used to power wind turbines and increase their efficiency. It was a recipient of the Royal Academy of Engineering’s MacRobert Award for Innovation.

One of the challenges that the technology addressed was wasted energy. Recently, AIP's hydraulic pump technology was adopted by the train operator ScotRail, allowing its trains to save 9,000 liters of diesel per carriage every year. The company claimed that from 64 to 73 percent of a train's energy is lost during braking and transmission. The AIP hydraulic pump eliminated the incidence of wasted energy through its computer-controlled valves that turn off the pump's cylinders when unused.

== Acquisition ==
Mitsubishi Heavy Industries acquired AIP in December 2010. It became a wholly owned subsidiary of the Japanese company through Mitsubishi Power Systems Europe (MPSE). MPSE targeted to build an offshore wind park project for a UK Government national initiative.

In 2018, the Danish multinational company Danfoss acquired AIP. This created a joint venture with Mitsubishi. Danfoss completely acquired Artemis Intelligent Power in 2021, effectively retiring the brand. Its products are now available in the market using the name Danfoss Digital Displacement.

Aside from its hydraulic system, AIP also holds several patents such as those involving high-capacity, high-speed, and digitally controlled valves. AIP has partnered with other companies to develop projects such as infinitely variable hydraulic transmission systems and the hydraulic energy storage technology, including the world's first tidal energy blade research center FastBlade constructed by Babcock International and the University of Edinburgh.
