= Aquamarine Power =

Company in Edinburgh, United Kingdom

Aquamarine Power Ltd.
- Company type: Private limited company
- Industry: Renewable energy
- Founded: 2005
- Defunct: 2015
- Headquarters: Edinburgh, Scotland, United Kingdom
- Key people: Mervyn Jones (Chairman); Martin McAdam (Chief Executive Officer)
- Products: Wave power technologies
- Number of employees: 14

Aquamarine Power was a British wave energy company, founded in 2005 to commercialise the Oyster wave energy converter, a device to capture energy from near-shore waves. They tested two versions of the Oyster device at the European Marine Energy Centre in Orkney.

They also worked on the development of the Neptune tidal turbine between 2007 and 2009.

The company's head offices were in Edinburgh, Scotland. Aquamarine Power ceased trading in November 2015.

== History ==
The Oyster concept originated from studies conducted in 2003 by the wave power research team at Queen's University Belfast, led by Professor Trevor Whittaker. The studies were co-funded by the Engineering and Physical Sciences Research Council and Allan Thomson, who had previously founded and led the UK's first commercial wave energy company, Wavegen.

In 2005, Thomson founded Aquamarine Power to progress the commercialisation of the Oyster device. In 2007, Scottish & Southern Energy subsidiary Renewable Technology Ventures Limited invested in Aquamarine with a further investment in 2010. In February 2009, Aquamarine Power and Queen's University signed an agreement to extend their R&D partnership to 2014.

In February 2009, Aquamarine Power signed an agreement with renewable energy company Airtricity, a subsidiary of Scottish & Southern Energy, to develop marine energy sites using the Oyster system.

In November 2009, the first full-scale, 315 kW, Oyster demonstrator began producing power when it was launched at the European Marine Energy Centre (EMEC) Billia Croo wave test site off the west coast of Mainland Orkney.

The second generation Oyster 2 – also called Oyster 800 (based on 800 kW rated power) – was tested at EMEC between 2012 and 2015. The plan was to install three devices (2.4 MW total installed capacity) at Billia Croo, but only one was installed. The project was provisionally dubbed the Orkney Wave Power Station.

By March 2015, the company had concluded it's Oyster 800 test programme, with the device being mothballed. The company was focusing on developing the WavePOD power take off subsystem, in collaboration with Carnegie Wave Energy and Bosch Rexroth. This was planned to be usable across different wave energy devices, to reduce costs. Aquamarine Power had significantly downsized the previous year, to just 18 employees from around 50 previously.

=== Administration ===
On 28 October 2015, BBC News reported that Aquamarine Power had called in administrators. No buyer was found and less than a month later, on 20 November, the company ceased to trade with the loss of fourteen jobs.

=== Lewis Wave Energy Farm ===
Lewis Wave Energy Farm
- Country: United Kingdom
- Location: North-west Lewis
- Coordinates: 58°25′24″N 6°27′27″W
- Status: Abandoned proposal

Power generation
- Units operational: 40-50 × 0.8-1.0 MW proposed
- Make and model: Aquamarine Oyster
- Nameplate capacity: 40 MW

External links
- Website: www.aquamarinepower.com

In March 2012, Aquamarine announced plans to install 40–50 Oyster devices on the seabed off the Western Isles in Scotland. The project was intended to be able to supply electricity to more than 38,000 homes. The site was to be off the coast of Lag na Greine, near Fivepenny Borve (Scottish Gaelic: Còig Peighinnean Bhuirgh), on the exposed north-west coast of the Isle of Lewis.

At the All Energy conference in May 2013, government minister Fergus Ewing announced the 40 MW scheme had been granted full consents, making it the largest permitted wave project. Construction was anticipated to start "in the next few years", although this was subject to upgrades to the electricity grid: a new high-voltage inter-connector cable was required to transmit green electricity from Lewis to the mainland of Scotland. In 2013, SSE announced they would not be able to build the inter-connector before 2017, potentially putting renewable energy projects at risk.

=== Neptune tidal stream turbine ===
Between 2007 and 2009, Aquamarine also worked on the development of a tidal stream turbine, called "Neptune". This was to have two three-bladed horizontal turbines mounted either side of a monopile foundation, similar to the MCT SeaGen turbine. It was initially expected to be tested at EMEC in 2011.

In January 2009, Aquamarine signed a £2m order with ABB for the electrical systems for two turbines, with a combined rated capacity of 2.4 MW.

However, by April 2009, Aquamarine announced that they were ceasing development of the tidal turbine, to focus on their Oyster wave energy device.

== Key people ==
The company's chief executive officer was Martin McAdam, who joined in 2008. The company was advised by Trevor Whittaker, inventor of the Oyster concept, and by Stephen Salter, inventor of the Salter's Duck.

== Investors ==
In November 2009, Aquamarine Power announced an investment of £11 million in the business. The principal investor during this investment round was ABB Group who invested £8 million. The other investors during the round included Scottish and Southern Energy who invested £2.7 million, with other historical investors making up the balance of £300k, among them Sigma Capital Group and Scottish Enterprise.

== Awards ==
Aquamarine Power won several awards. In 2008, it was named Emerging Technology Promoter of the Year in the Ernst & Young Euromoney Global Renewable Energy Awards. In 2009, it was named Innovator of the Year by the British Renewable Energy Association. It also received the Innovation Award for Energy at the Engineer Technology and Innovation Awards 2009 and Scottish Green Awards for the Best Green Industry SME. In 2010 it was listed on the GlobalCleantech 100 list.

== See also ==
- Marine energy
