= 1903 Faroese general election =

Danish territorial election

Partial general elections were held in the Faroe Islands in 1903 to elect nine of the eighteen elected members of the Løgting. The Danish administrator (Amtmaður) and the local dean (Próstur) were also members, with the administrator serving as the speaker.

== Electoral system ==
Members of the Løgting were elected by first-past-the-post voting, with voters having as many votes as there were seats available in their constituency. Nine of the 18 seats were elected every two years. Voting was restricted to men aged 25 or over who met certain tax-paying criteria.

== Results ==
Constituency	Elected members	Notes
Eysturoy	Jacob Fredrik Olsen	
Eysturoy	Thomas Juul Petersen	
Eysturoy	Jógvan Poulsen	Re-elected
Eysturoy	Andreas Weihe	
Norðurstreymoy	Johan Kristian Frederik Dam	
Norðurstreymoy	Ólavur á Heygum	
Suðurstreymoy	Søren Emil Müller	Previously elected in Norðurstreymoy
Vágar	Dánjal Pauli Michelsen	Re-elected
Vágar	Zacharias Nielsen	
Source: Løgting

=== By constituency ===
Norðurstreymoy
Candidate	Votes	%
Ólavur á Heygum	78	30.47
Johan Kristian Frederik Dam	77	30.08
Ole Jacobsen	53	20.70
Johan Pauli Olsen	47	18.36
Søren Emil Müller	1	0.39
Total	256	100.00
Total votes	128	–
Registered voters/turnout	271	47.23
Source: Løgting
