= Stephen Salter =

South African-born Scottish academic and inventor

- Born: 7 December 1938; Johannesburg, South Africa
- Died: 23 February 2024 (aged 85); Edinburgh, Scotland
- Education: University of Cambridge
- Known for: • Salter's Duck • Cloud reflectivity enhancement • Wave generation and absorption in wave tanks
- Awards: MBE, FRSE
- Scientific career
- Fields: Wave power Engineering; Geoengineering; Fluid dynamics
- Workplaces: University of Edinburgh

Professor Stephen Hugh Salter, MBE, FRSE (7 December 1938 – 23 February 2024) was a South African-born Scottish academic who was Emeritus Professor of Engineering Design at the University of Edinburgh and inventor of the eponymous Salter's duck wave energy device. Salter was also a proponent of geoengineering and was responsible for creating the concept of the mechanical enhancement of clouds to achieve cloud reflectivity enhancement.

The wide wave tank at the University of Edinburgh—a novel design and invention by Salter, built in 1977—was the world's first multi-directional wave tank equipped with absorbing wavemakers. Feedback control systems on the wavemaking flaps were used for the absorption of reflected waves, propagating along the water surface of the tank interior towards the 89 flaps. These force-feedback wave paddles were further developed and commercialised by Edinburgh Designs, and are used in many facilities worldwide. Salter argued in 2001 that to properly test wave and tidal energy devices required a circular combined wave and current basin, which ultimately led to the construction of the FloWave Ocean Energy Research Facility at the University of Edinburgh.

Together with Win Rampen, Salter also played a key role in the development of digital-displacement pump-motors, later manufactured by Artemis Intelligent Power. Salter was a Specialist Advisor at wave energy company Aquamarine Power advising on the development of the Oyster wave energy converter, however the company ceased trading in 2015.

Salter was "one of the leading voices" of the marine cloud brightening movement. Born in Johannesburg on 7 December 1938, he died in Edinburgh on 23 February 2024, at the age of 85.

== Salter's duck ==
While historic references to the power of waves do exist, the modern scientific pursuit of wave energy was begun in the 1970s by Salter, in response to the oil crisis. His 1974 invention became known as Salter's Duck or Nodding Duck, although it was officially referred to as the "Edinburgh Duck". In small scale controlled tests, the Duck's curved cam-like body could stop 90% of wave motion, converting 90% of that to electricity. The Duck failed to secure a 9.5 million pound government grant, and the government's Wave Energy Programme was shut down on 19 March 1982, in a closed meeting. It was later found that an analysis of Salter's Duck had resulted in a miscalculation of the estimated cost of energy production by a factor of 10. Some wave power advocates believe that this error, combined with a general lack of enthusiasm for renewable energy in the 1980s after oil prices fell, hindered the advancement of wave power technology.

== Honours and awards ==
Salter was appointed Member of the Order of the British Empire (MBE) in the 2004 Birthday Honours for services to engineering. In 1991 he was elected as a Fellow of the Royal Society of Edinburgh. In 2012 he received the Royal Academy of Engineering Sustained Achievement Award. In 2021 he was inducted into the Scottish Engineering Hall of Fame.
