= SeWave =

SeWave was a wave farm project in Nípanin, Faroe Islands. The project was developed by the joint venture of the Scottish wave energy developer Wavegen and the Faroe's power company SEV.

The feasibility study of the wave farm was conducted in 2002 by Eni, SEV and Wavegen. Based on the project findings, in 2003 Wavegen and SEV established a joint venture SeWave for the design and building of the wave farm project. The project bases on the design of Islay LIMPET, which uses a tunnelled wave plant concept with an oscillating water column device built into the face of a cliff, utilizing an air chamber in order to capture wave energy.

The model tests, site investigations and design issues were completed by start of 2005. The wave power plant was expected to be in use by 2010. The overall project costs are expected to be up to £7 million.

However, the project was deadpooled and United States Department of Energy listed this project to be inactive.
