= Christian Ludvig Johannesen =

Faroese teacher and independence activist

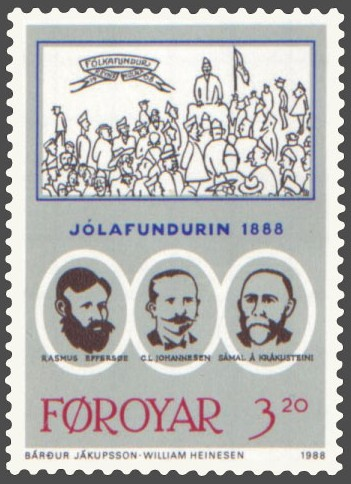
Postage stamp from 1988; Johannesen is depicted in the middle

Christian Ludvig Johannesen (1862–1935) was a Faroese teacher and independence activist.

Johannesen was one of the nine men that signed the invitation to the Christmas Meeting of 1888, which is considered to have marked the beginning of the Faroese independence movement.

In 1891, together with Jógvan Poulsen, he published Förisk ABC og lesingabók (A Faroese ABC and Reader), the first Faroese reader for primary schools. However, it was soon superseded by Hammershaimb's normative guide.
