= Doris Olafsdóttir =

Faroese footballer (born 1986)

Personal information
- Full name: Doris í Garði Olafsdóttir
- Birth name: Doris í Garði Joensen
- Date of birth: 13 July 1986 (age 40)
- Place of birth: Eiði, Faroe Islands
- Position: Centre back

Senior career*
Years	Team	Apps	(Gls)
2002	GÍ	3	(0)
2003–2005	EB/Streymur	45	(6)
2006	GÍ	23	(2)
2007–2009	KÍ	37	(6)
2010–2012	AB	58	(13)
2013–2014	HB	9	(1)
2014	EBS/Skála	3	(1)

International career^{‡}
2003–2004	Faroe Islands U19	5	(0)
2006–2013	Faroe Islands	7	(0)
- * Club domestic league appearances and goals as of 18 October 2014 ‡ National team caps and goals as of 9 April 2013

Doris í Garði Olafsdóttir (née Joensen; born 13 July 1986) is a Faroese former footballer who played as a centre back. She has been a member of the Faroe Islands women's national team.
