= 1875 Faroese general election =

Danish territorial election

Partial general elections were held in the Faroe Islands in 1875 to elect nine of the eighteen elected members of the Løgting. The Danish administrator (Amtmaður) and the local dean (Próstur) were also members, with the administrator serving as the speaker.

== Electoral system ==
Members of the Løgting were elected by first-past-the-post voting, with voters having as many votes as there were seats available in their constituency. Nine of the 18 seats were elected every two years. Voting was restricted to men aged 25 or over who met certain tax-paying criteria.

== Results ==
Constituency	Elected members	Notes
Eysturoy	Clement Joensen	
Eysturoy	Gregers Joensen	
Eysturoy	Johannes Petersen	Re-elected
Eysturoy	Peter Christian Weihe	Re-elected
Norðurstreymoy	Joen Hansen	
Norðurstreymoy	Samuel Peter Samuelsen	
Suðurstreymoy	Harald Emil Høst	
Vágar	Mikkjal Danielsen	
Vágar	Zacharias Nielsen	Re-elected
Source: Løgting

=== By constituency ===
Norðurstreymoy
Candidate	Votes	%
Joen Hansen	9	30.00
Samuel Peter Samuelsen	7	23.33
Johannes Olsen	4	13.33
Daniel Jacob Jacobsen	4	13.33
Ole Jacobsen	3	10.00
Peter Hansen	2	6.67
Oliver Petræus Effersøe	1	3.33
Total	30	100.00
Registered voters/turnout	155	–
Source: Løgting

== Aftermath ==
Harald Emil Høst left the country in 1878 and was replaced by Lütje Lützen.
