= Ljósá =

- Village
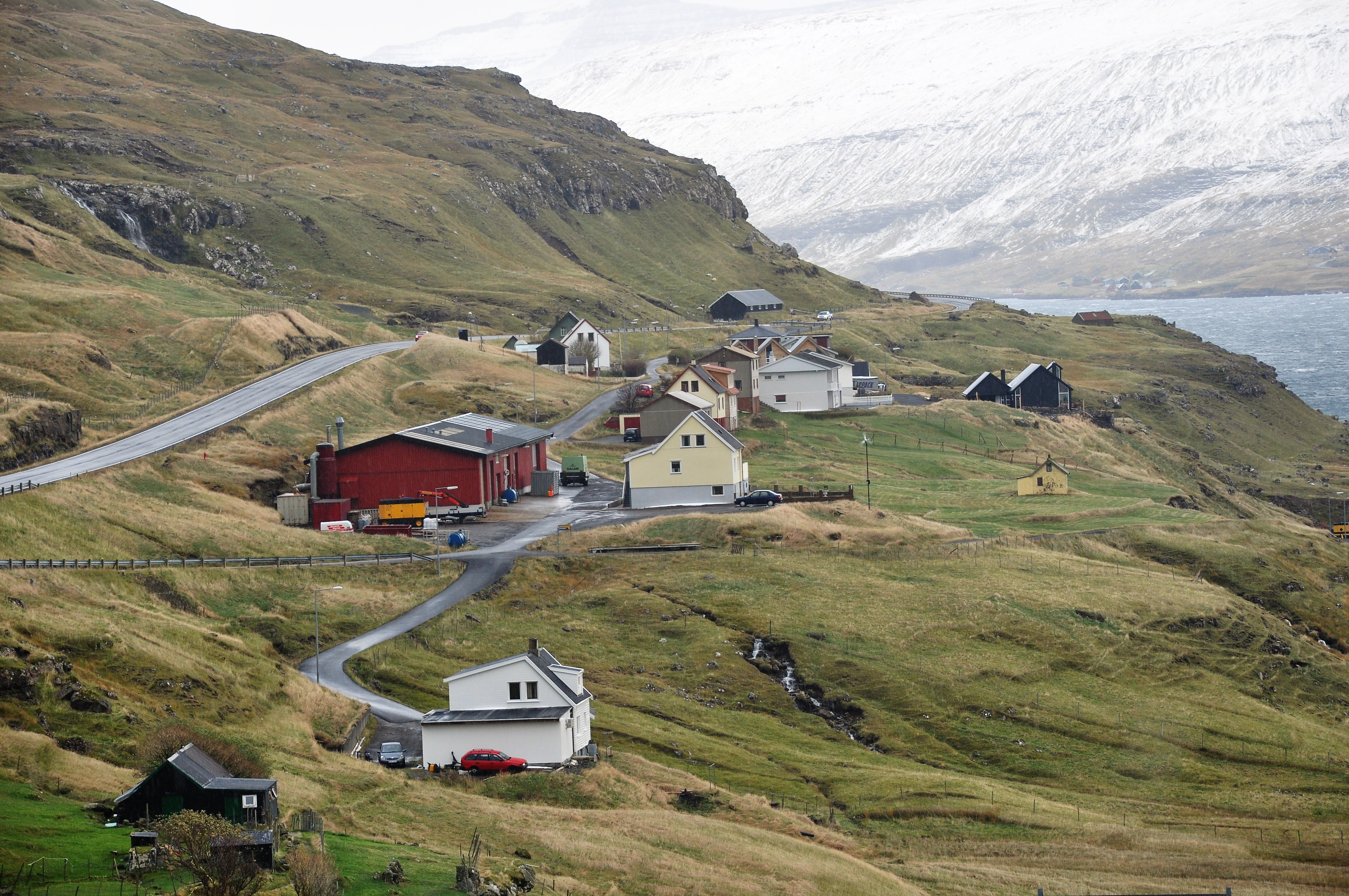
- Ljósá

- Location in the Faroe Islands
- Coordinates: 62°16′1″N 7°3′43.35″W
- State: Denmark
- Constituent country: Faroe Islands
- Region: Eysturoy
- Municipality: Eiði

Population (30 April 2025)
  - Total: 32
- Time zone: UTC±00:00 (WET)
  - Summer (DST): UTC+01:00 (WEST)
- Postal code: 466
- Climate: Cfc

Ljósá (Danish: Lyså) is a village located on Eysturoy in the Faroe Islands, in Eiði Municipality. It is located 4 km south of Eiði and 4 km north of Svínáir.

The village was founded around 1840.
