= Botnur Power Plant =

Hydroelectric power station supplying the Faroe Islands

Botnur power plant
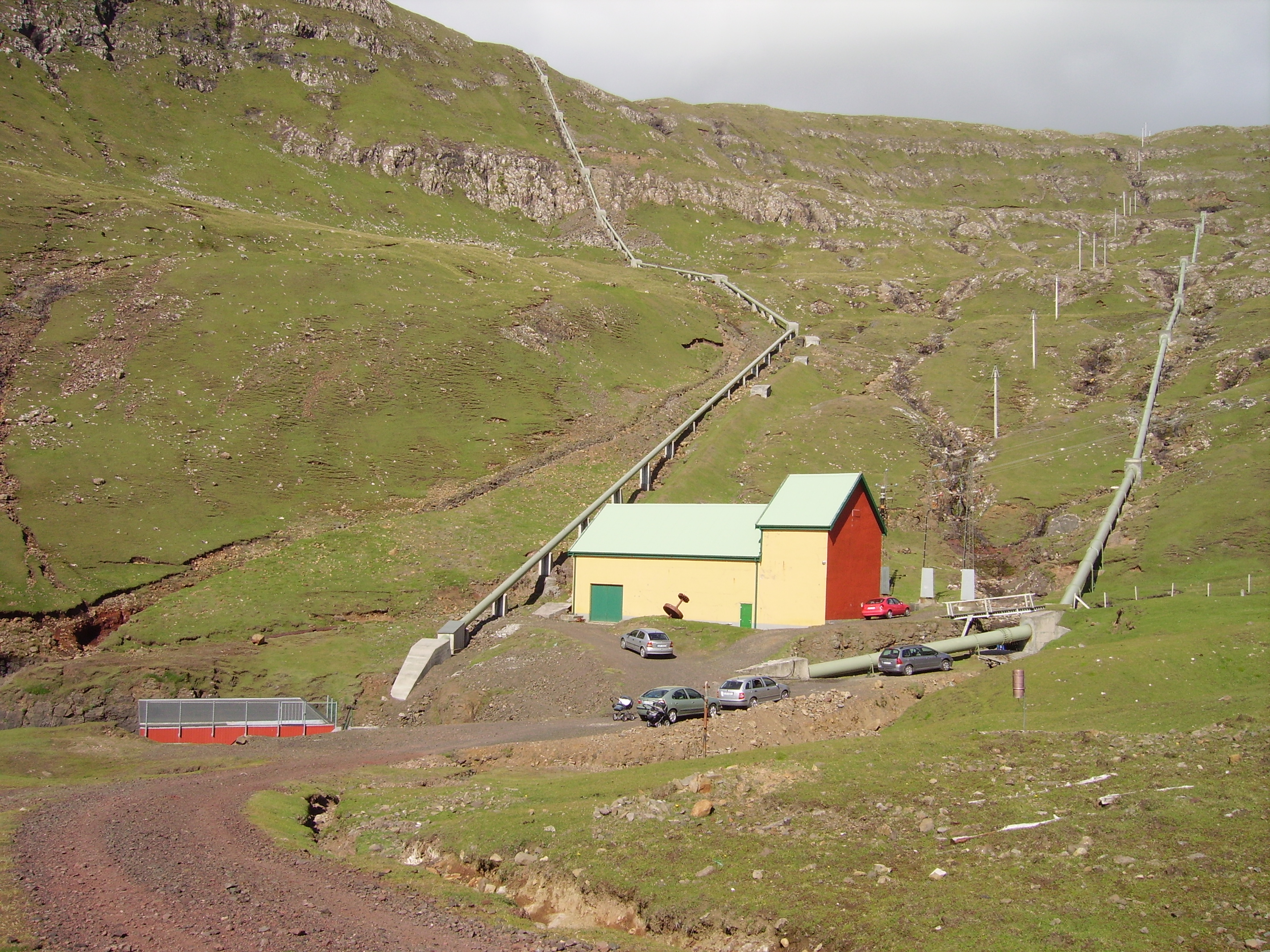
- The Botnur hydroelectric plant, with its two water supply pipes.

- Location in the Faroe Islands
- Official name: Elektrisitetsverkið í Botni
- Coordinates: 61.4863°N 6.8695°W
- Status: Operational

Power Station
- Operator: SEV
- Commission date: 18 July 1921
- Turbines: 1 X 1.1 MW Pelton-type; 1 X 2.2 MW Pelton-type
- Installed capacity: 3.3 MW

The Botnur power plant (Faroese: Elektrisitetsverkið í Botni) is a hydroelectric power station supplying the Faroe Islands' southernmost island of Suðuroy with electricity. It is located to the north of Vágur. Botnur was the first hydroelectric plant built in the Faroes.

The plant was built by the municipality of Vágur, partly to power the ship cableway in Vágseiði. It became operational on 18 July 1921. In 1960, the plant was acquired by SEV from Suðuroyar Elverk.

The plant is equipped with two turbines. One is a 1.1 MW Pelton turbine, commissioned in 1965, and it is supplied by water from the Ryskivatn lake, which is again supplied by the Miðvatn lake at 345m altitude, holding 550,000 m^{3} of water. The other is a 2.2 MW Francis turbine, commissioned in 1966, supplied from the Vatnsnes lake (Vatnsnesvatn) at 177m altitude, holding 725,000 m^{3} of water. Botnur is an unmanned plant; it is operated from the Vágsverkið (also called Heimaru Oyrar) power plant.
