= Economy of the Faroe Islands =

Economy of Faroe Islands
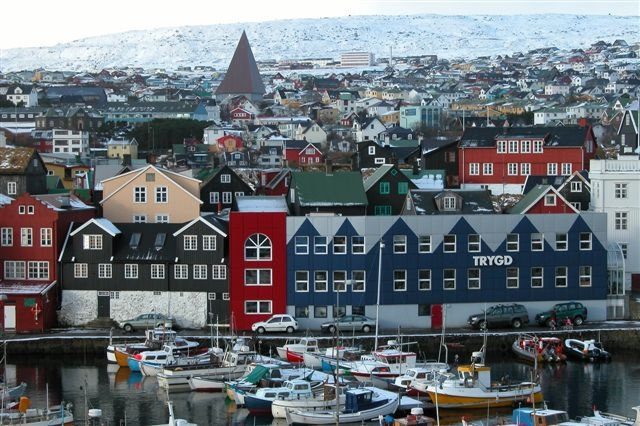
- Tórshavn is the capital and largest town of the Faroe Islands.
- Currency: Faroese króna (pegged with Danish krone, (DKK))
- Fiscal year: Calendar year
- Trade organisations: None

Statistics
- GDP: US$2.83 billion (2017)
- GDP rank: 166th (nominal) / 179th (PPP)
- GDP growth: 7.5% (2013 est.)
- GDP per capita: $54,833 (2017)
- GDP by sector: Agriculture: 16%; Industry: 29%; Services: 55% (2007)
- Inflation (CPI): 1.3% (2019) ▲0.1%
- Population below national poverty line: 10.1% (2018) ▼0.4%
- Labour force: 31,667 (2019)
- Labour force by occupation: Agriculture: 10.7%; Industry: 18.9%; Services: 70.3% (2010)
- Unemployment: 1.7% in 2019 ▼0.4%
- Main industries: Fishing, fish processing, fish farming, small ship repair and refurbishment, handicrafts

External
- Exports: DKK 9.77 billion (2019-20) ▲14%
- Export goods: Fish and fish products: 90%; Stamps; Ships
- Main export partners: Russia 23.8% United States 11.2% United Kingdom 10.6% Denmark 7.7% China 7.1% Germany 6.5% Norway 5.7% (2016)
- Imports: DKK 8.4 billion (2019-20) ▲9%
- Import goods: Consumer goods: 24%; Machinery and transport equipment: 23.5%; Fuels: 21.4%; Raw materials and semi-manufactures; Fish; Salt
- Main import partners: Denmark 37.4% Germany 13.3% Norway 9.3% China 5.6% Sweden 4.3% Iceland 3.8% (2016)

Public finance
- Budget balance: $104.1 million (2018)
- Revenue: $1.54 billion (2018)
- Spending: $1.43 billion (2018)
- Economic aid: Block grant from the Danish state: 641.8 million kr./year (2016–2022) (c. US$96 million)

The economy of the Faroe Islands was the 166th largest in the world in 2014, having a nominal gross domestic product (GDP) of $2.613 billion per annum. GDP increased from DKK 8 billion in 1999, to 21 billion in 2019. The vast majority of Faroese exports, around 90%, consists of fishery products.

== History ==
After the severe economic troubles of the early 1990s, brought on by a drop in the vital fish catch and poor management of the economy, the Faroe Islands have recently recovered, with unemployment down to 5% in mid-1998, and holding below 3% since 2006, one of the lowest rates in Europe.

== Challenges and opportunities ==
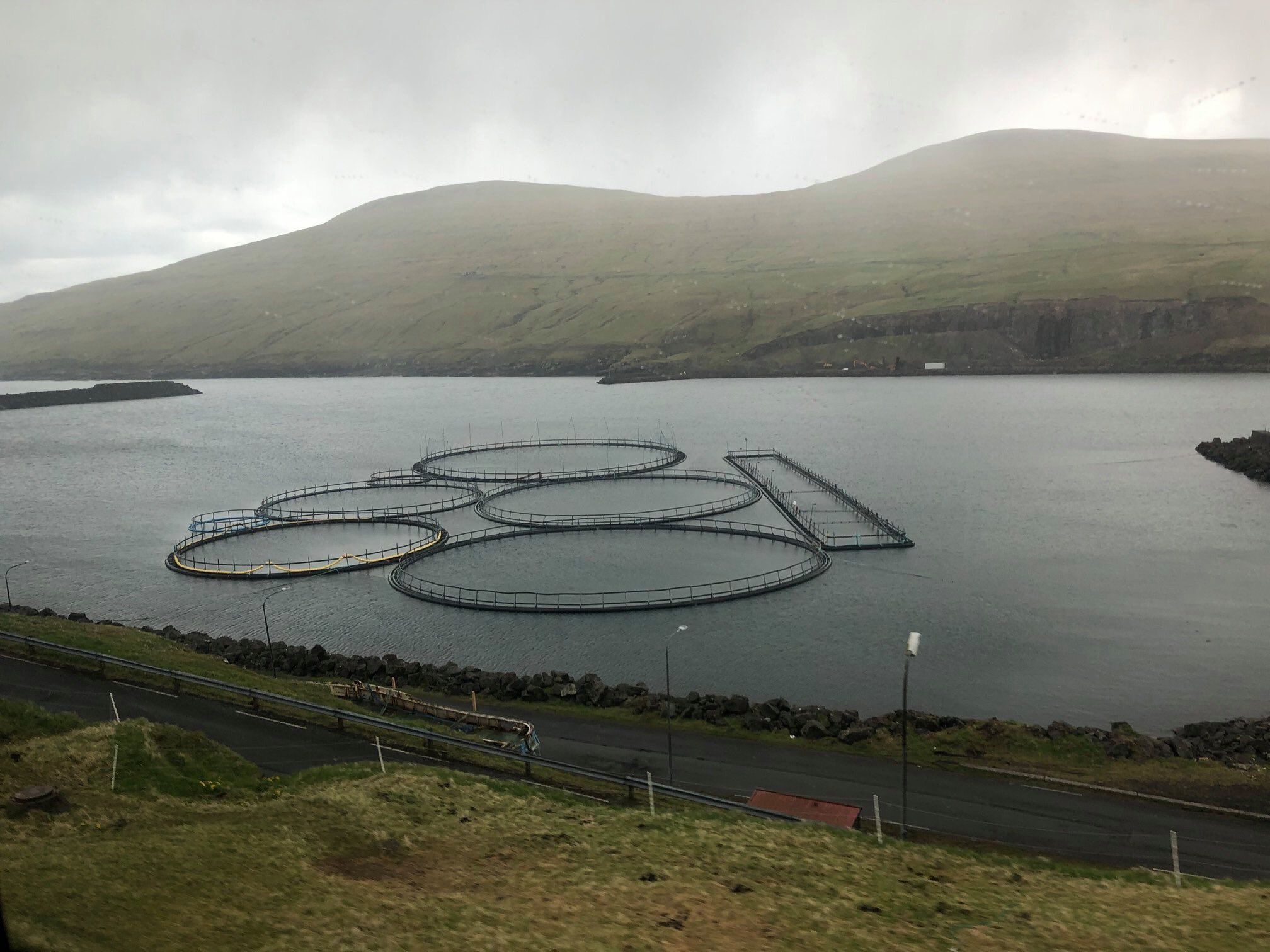
Salmon farm

Salaries by industry, 2019
1. Service (64.0%)
2. Fishing & farming (20.0%)
3. Construction & manufacturing (16.0%)
4. 0.00%
5. 0.00%
6. 0.00%
7. 0.00%

High dependence on fishing (including salmon farming) means the Faroe Islands' economy remains vulnerable. The Faroese hope to broaden their economic base by building new fish-processing plants. The islands allow up to 25% foreign ownership of ocean industry decreasing gradually until 2032 when foreign ownership must end. Petroleum found close to the Faroese area gives hope for deposits in the immediate area, which may lay the basis for sustained economic prosperity. Also important are the annual subsidy from Denmark, which amounted to about 3% of the GDP.

The Faroes have one of the lowest unemployment rates in Europe (1% in 2019), but this is not necessarily a sign of a recovering economy, as many young students move to Denmark and other countries once they are finished with high school. This leaves a largely middle-aged and elderly population that may lack the skills and knowledge to take IT positions in business and industry. Since 2000, new information technology and business projects have been fostered in the Faroe Islands to attract new investment. The result from these projects is not yet known but is hoped to bring a better market economy to the Faroe Islands. The population was around 52,000 by 2019.

General salaries increased from DKK 7 billion in 2013 to DKK 10 billion in 2019. In 2020, salmon exports were DKK 3.3 billion. Fishing industries occupied 1,441 people on land and 1,341 at sea.

== Trade ==
In 2014 the Faroe Islands had a trade surplus of 401 million DKK, a figure that rose to 1.43 billion DKK in 2016. As of 2016, the Faroe Islands mainly imported goods from Denmark (2,467 million DKK), Germany (877 million DKK), and Norway (610 million DKK). The country's top export destinations were Russia (1,907 million DKK), the United States (898 million DKK), the United Kingdom (851 million DKK), and Denmark (697 million DKK). European Union countries constituted 72.9% of total Faroese imports, while the exports of the Faroe Islands were more equally distributed between European Union (44.4%) and non-European Union countries (55.6%). The vast majority of Faroese exports, around 90%, consists of fishery products. Russian countersanctions on food imports from Norway and the European Union, saw the Faroe Islands increase its fresh salmon exports to Russia. The Faroe Islands has a free trade agreement with Iceland since 2005.

Imports and exports in 2014; values in million Danish krone (DKK)
Rank	Imports		Rank	Exports	
Rank	Origin	Value	Rank	Destination	Value
1	Denmark	2,467 DKK	1	Russia	1,907 DKK
2	Germany	897 DKK	2	United States	898 DKK
3	Norway	610 DKK	3	United Kingdom	851 DKK
4	China	371 DKK	4	Denmark	697 DKK
5	Sweden	282 DKK	5	China	569 DKK
6	Iceland	248 DKK	6	Germany	521 DKK
7	Italy	186 DKK	7	Norway	460 DKK
8	United Kingdom	169 DKK	8	France	369 DKK
9	France	148 DKK	9	Netherlands	284 DKK
10	Netherlands	143 DKK	10	Poland	251 DKK
–	European Union	4,807 DKK	–	European Union	3,561 DKK
–	Non-EU countries	1,785 DKK	–	Non-EU countries	4,461 DKK
–	Total	6,592 DKK	–	Total	8,022 DKK

== Energy ==
Oil consumption peaked at over 300,000 tonnes in 2020, of which 30% was for fishing vessels. In 2014 217,547 tonnes of oil products were consumed in the Faroe Islands. Of this 31.58% was consumed by fishing vessels, 14.73% was used by SEV for electricity production, 23.23% was consumed in air, sea or land transport, 9.6% was used in the industry, and the rest was used in public or private buildings.

The islands have 6 hydroelectric plants, 4 diesel plants and several wind power plants with a capacity factor above 40%. In 2014, a 12MW wind farm for DKK 180 million became operational near Torshavn and increased wind capacity from 6.6 to 18.6MW. It decreases oil consumption by 8,000 ton (approximately 4M€) per year. A 2.3MW 700 kWh lithium-ion battery became operational in 2016. Planners also consider converting the existing hydropower to pumped-storage hydroelectricity. Tidal power and Thermal energy storage solutions are also considered. The islands have a goal of 100% green electricity production by 2030.

External images
- Current production, pie diagram
- Current production, numbers

In 2014 and 2017 50.8% of the electricity production of SEV in the Faroe Islands came from green energy like hydro and wind, while 49.2% was produced by the thermal power plants, which was 12.4% less than in 2013.

- fossil fuel: 49.2%
- hydro: 39.5%
- wind: 11.3% (2014)
- nuclear: 0%

Total annual production: 305.4 GWh (2014) of which the production of thermal, hydropower and wind power was:

- Thermal: 150,2 GWh
- Hydropower: 120,7 GWh
- Wind: 34,5 GWh

The Faroe Islands have no electricity connections to other areas, and thus operate in island condition. Some islands are also not connected to the other islands, and must maintain their own electric system.

== Other ==
Agriculture - products: milk, potatoes, vegetables; sheep; salmon, other fish

Currency: 1 Danish krone (DKr) = 100 ører

Exchange rates: Danish kroner (DKr) per US$1 – 5.560 (2008), 7.336 (January 2000), 6.976 (1999), 6.701 (1998), 6.604 (1997), 5.799 (1996), 5.602 (1995)
