= Salter's duck =

Device that converts wave power into electricity

Salter's duck, also known as the nodding duck or by its official name the Edinburgh duck, is a device that converts wave power into electricity. The wave impact induces rotation of gyroscopes located inside a pear-shaped "duck", and an electrical generator converts this rotation into electricity with an overall efficiency of up to 90%.

The Salter's duck was invented by Stephen Salter in response to the oil shortage in the 1970s and was one of the earliest generator designs proposed to the Wave Energy programme in the United Kingdom. The funding for the project was cut off in the early 1980s after oil supplies rebounded and the UK government moved away from alternative energy sources. It was also later found that agencies advising the UK government had ignored data regarding the costs of the technology in favor of their own more pessimistic figures. As of 2026 no wave-power devices have ever gone into large-scale production.

== History ==
As a result of the 1973 oil crisis, Salter set about creating a source of alternative energy. The idea for creating this came about from his studies on a lavatory cistern while at the University of Edinburgh. He invented Salter's duck in 1974 and attempted to make it the main device of choice for the Wave Energy Programme in the United Kingdom. A prototype attempt to use the device was constructed in 1976 off Dores Beach and provided "some 20 kW of power". Coventry University, which helped with the design, went on to develop a separate, slightly modified type called the Sea Clam.

The UK government's Energy Technology Support Unit (ETP) was set up in 1974 as an agency on behalf of the then Department of Energy. Although its function was to manage research programmes on renewable energy and energy conservation, the unit was operated by the United Kingdom Atomic Energy Authority.

Cost considerations based on the findings were among the main factors in the ducks not being put into widespread production under the Wave Energy Programme in the late 1970s. This, together with the 1980s oil glut, meant the perceived need for immediate alternative energy sources subsequently declined. In 1982 the Wave Energy Programme was shut down, ending the hope of Salter's duck becoming a mainstay in the alternative energy campaign.

It later emerged that Rendel Palmer & Tritton (RPT), the consulting firm tasked with performing the calculations for the ETP, had produced cost figures that were too high (and significantly higher than other estimates from the egineering firm Whessoe) to allow the 9.5 million pounds in government grant allocations from being given to Salter and his group. In particular, capital costs were given as almost ten times higher than those arrived at by Clive Grove-Palmer, a respected Department of Energy engineer seconded to work on the Duck project. The government's defense was that RPT provided the "best available advice at the time." Salter himself later said that he believed his invention was seen as a threat to the centralized power station projects then favoured by ministers and civil servants. After a long, but unsuccessful campaign to save the project, Salter's team disbanded in early 1987.

With the increase in research into alternative and renewable energy in the 2000s, Salter's duck has begun to be used as a part of wave energy research in the United Kingdom.

== Design ==
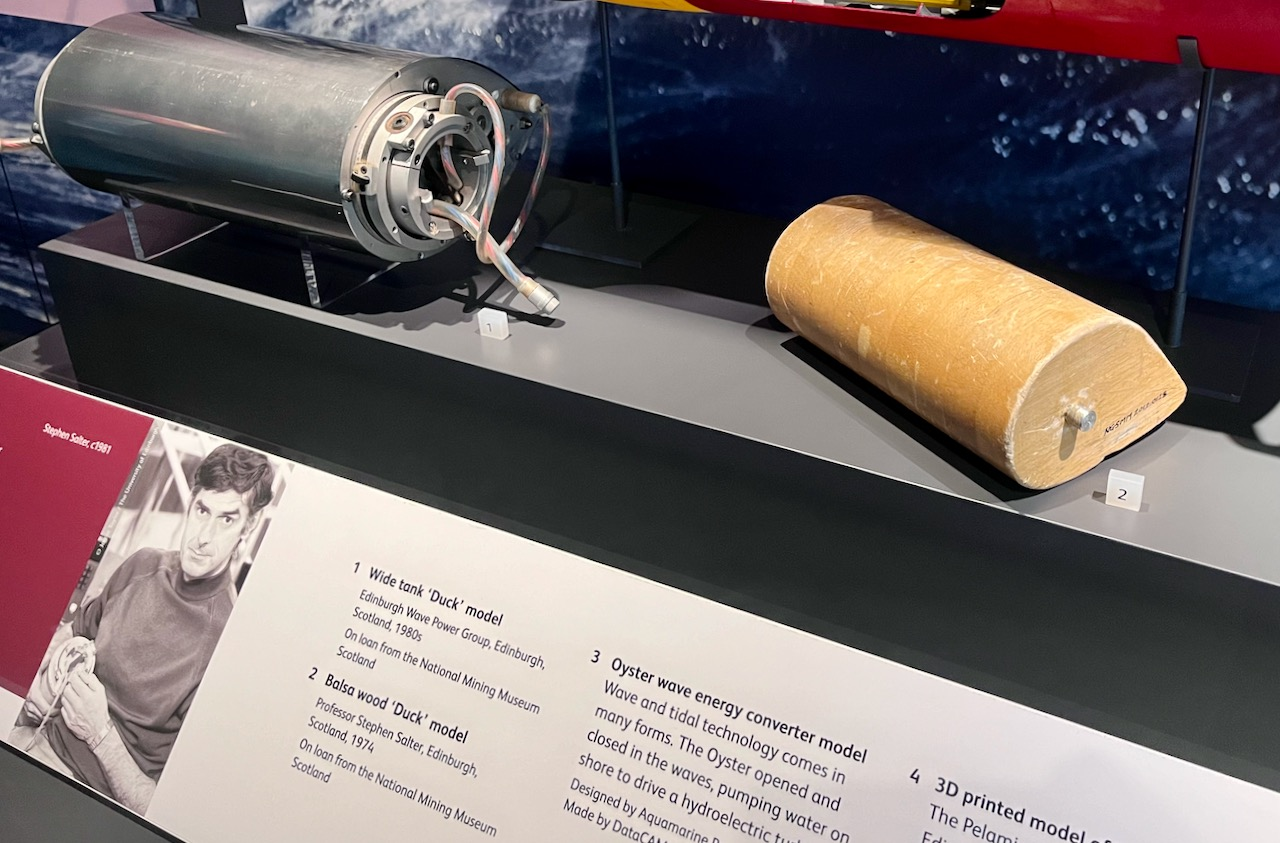
Models of the Duck displayed at the National Museum of Scotland

The original prototype of Salter's duck was made of "a string of floating vanes of rudimentary 'duck' cross-sections linked through a central spine". The string itself had 12 ducks attached to it that were 50 cm (20 in) wide mounted on a spine 27 cm (11 in) in diameter and 6 m (20 ft) long. It was made at Coventry University, with materials from Ready Made Concrete and Insituform. The final design worked by having 20 to 30 ducks connected together by the jointed spine, with each duck moving with the waves that hit it and transferring the energy of the impact to "six to ten pumps" for each duck. The pear shape of the ducks have them facing the waves due to the decided orientation of their spine so that they rock and turn over when a wave hits them. This causes four gyroscopes inside to move back and forth, creating hydraulic energy that is transferred to a turbine or generator.

== Energy efficiency ==
In order to determine the efficiency of energy output from Salter's duck, in 1975, scientist Swift-Hook and others ran a series of tests. The optimum range of the ducks was determined according to the formula,

$0.16 < \frac{r}{\lambda} < 0.2$

The use of a lowercase r in this formula indicates the back radius of the ducks. They also had to test for the incidence energy (R) given off by a submerged surface (s), the formula of which is,

$\text {R}\,\! = \int\limits_{}^{} \big(\upsilon_n - \mathit{u_n} \big)^2 \text {ds}\,\! \int\limits_{}^{} \mathit{u_n} ^2 \text {ds}\,\!$

In this formula, the v stands for body velocity and the u for unperturbed fluid velocity perpendicular to the surface. With this, they were able to then use the final formula that tested for the absorption efficiency, eta (n),

$\eta = \big( 1- \mathit{R}_{min} \big) \times 1 \big(\frac{- 4 \pi d}{\lambda} \big)$

The use of these three formulas allowed Swift-Hook to determine that Salter's duck is able to convert "90% of the wave energy into mechanical energy". However, this percentage was lower when the duck was tested in a laboratory. In varying types of realistic conditions, the efficiency of the duck varies wildly and often drops to around 50%, as ducks are more often used in rough weather in order to convert enough wave power. Conversely, ducks are not useful in calm weather, as the waves would not have enough energy for there to be substantial energy output (even at high conversion efficiency).

== See also ==
- Tidal power
