= Eiði Power Plant =

Hydroelectric power station in the Faroe Islands

Eiði power plant
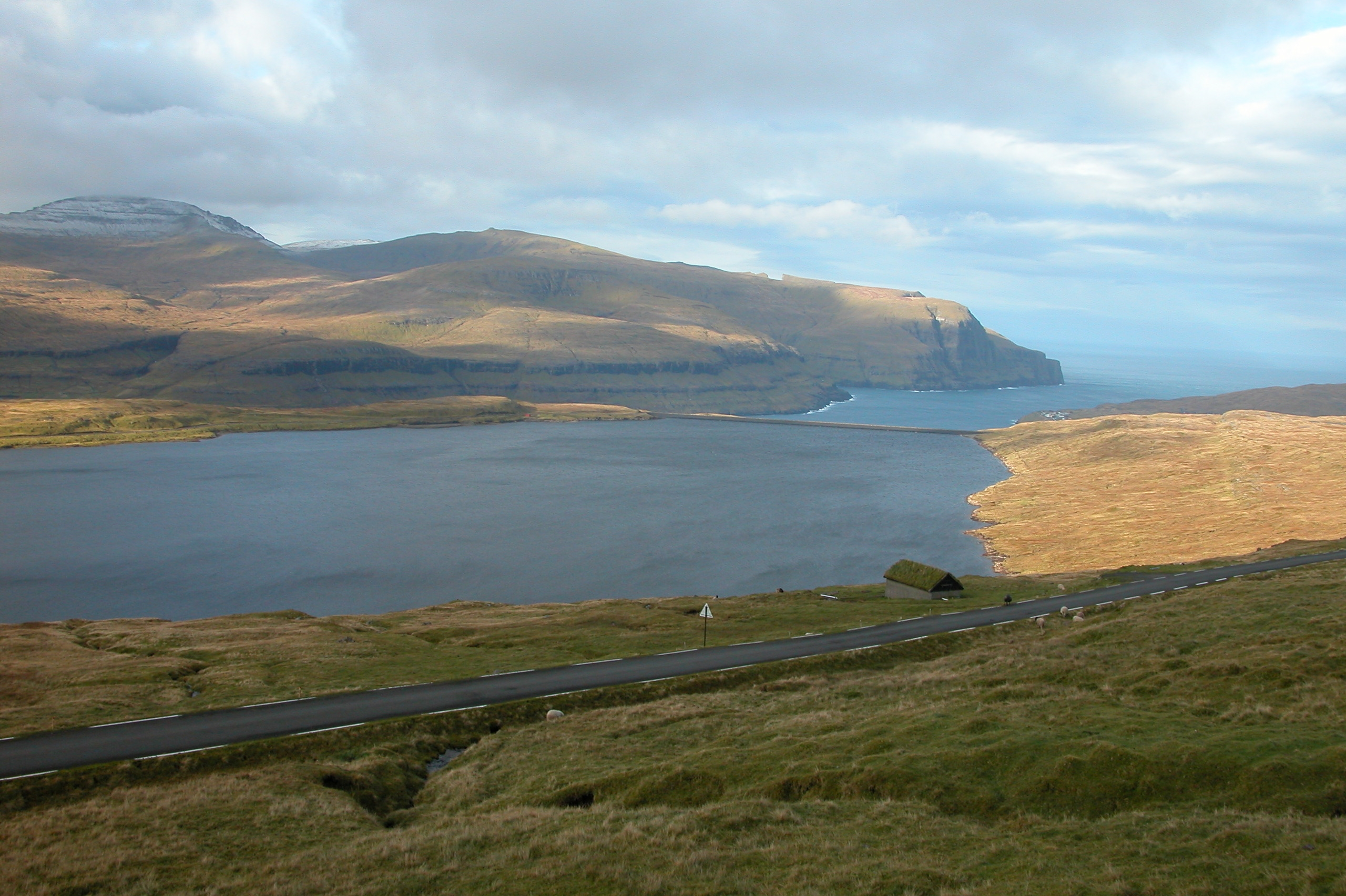
- Official name: Eiðisverkið
- Country: Faroe Islands
- Location: Eysturoy, Faroe Islands
- Coordinates: 62°16′52″N 7°04′21″W
- Status: Operational
- Commission date: 1987
- Owner: SEV

Power generation
- Nameplate capacity: 21.7 MW
- Annual net output: 55 GWh

The Eiði Hydroelectric Power Station (Faroese: Eiðisverkið) is the largest hydroelectric power station in the Faroe Islands. It stands below a dam on Lake Eiði (elevation 129 to 149 meters or 423 to 489 feet) on the island of Eysturoy.

The power plant started production on April 28, 1987, and it was built and is owned by the power producer and distributor SEV. Originally, two Francis turbines were installed with a capacity of 6.7 MW each. A third turbine began operation in 2013, with a 15 km water collection tunnel to the south. Overall cost has been DKK 1 billion. The plant operates at an installed capacity of 21.7 MW, with an average annual production of about 55 GWh. The reservoir holds water for 5.5 days of production.
