= Mitsubishi Power Systems Europe =

Sustainable energy company

Mitsubishi Power Systems Europe (MPSE) is a company that specialises in developing sustainable energy technologies in Europe, Africa and the Middle East. It is headquartered in London and has offices in Leeds, Hamburg, Madrid, Milan, Prague, and Vienna.

== History ==
The company, a subsidiary of Mitsubishi Heavy Industries Europe, was established on 8 October 2007.

MPSE is – according to its website – focused on bringing together technology and expertise into one division. It, along with its sister companies Mitsubishi Power Systems America and Mitsubishi Power Systems Asia-Pacific, is a part of the Mitsubishi Group of companies.

In April 2009, MPSE acquired Maintenance Partners NV, a Belgium firm that specialised in the maintenance, repair, and reconditioning of electrical equipment.

On 25 February 2010 it was announced that MPSE would fund a research project looking into wind turbine technology. It would invest more than £100m in offshore wind turbine research in Britain and create up to 200 jobs by 2014. The UK Department of Energy and Climate Change also announced that it was to help fund the project, which it will do with a grant of £30 million.

At the time of the announcement the Business Secretary, Peter Mandelson, and David Warren, British Ambassador to Japan, both spoke favorably of the relationship between Mitsubishi and its investment in wind turbine R&D and the UK's growing low-carbon sector.
