= Gregers Joensen =

Faroese teacher and politician (1835–1897)

- Born: December 14, 1835; Eiði, Faroe Islands
- Died: June 12, 1897 (aged 61)
- Occupations: Teacher, politician
- Title: Mayor of Eiði
- Term: 1894–1897
- Predecessor: none
- Successor: Jens Jørgen Kruse

Gregers Joensen (December 14, 1835 – June 12, 1897), also known as Grækaris Joensen, was a Faroese teacher and politician.

Joensen was born in Eiði. He received a teaching degree in 1871 and was the first person to graduate from the Faroese Teachers School. He worked as a teacher in Eiði until his death in 1897. Joensen represented Eysturoy in the Faroese Parliament from 1875 to 1887, and again from 1895 until his death. At the same time, he served as the first mayor of the Municipality of Eiði from 1894 to 1897.
