= Islay LIMPET =

Wave power station in Scotland

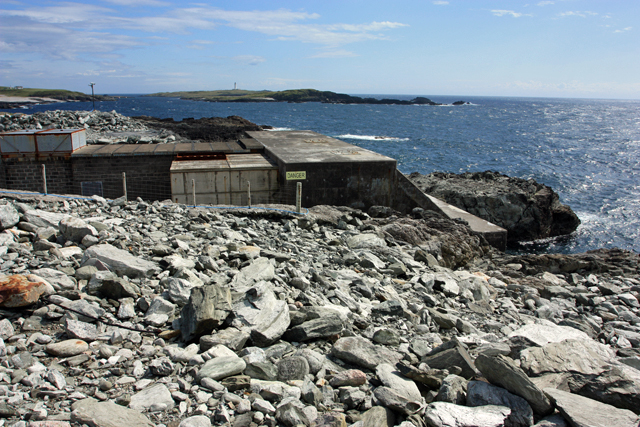
- The LIMPET installation in July 2009
- Country: Scotland
- Location: Islay
- Coordinates: 55°41′25.56″N 6°31′20.12″W
- Status: Decommissioned
- Commission date: 2000
- Decommission date: 2011

Wave power station
- Type: Oscillating water column

Power generation
- Nameplate capacity: 250 kW

Islay LIMPET (Land Installed Marine Power Energy Transmitter) was the world's first commercial wave power device and was connected to the United Kingdom's National Grid, in November 2000. The device was initially rated at 500 kW, but this was later downrated to 250 kW. The device was eventually decommissioned in 2011.

It was constructed on the coast of the island of Islay on the west coast of Scotland, and harnessed the movement of waves through air pressure in a concrete chamber, driving an air turbine.

The shoreline location was seen as a logical first step in the development and demonstration of wave energy technologies, as access for operation and maintenance was easier, possible in all but the worst weather.

== History ==
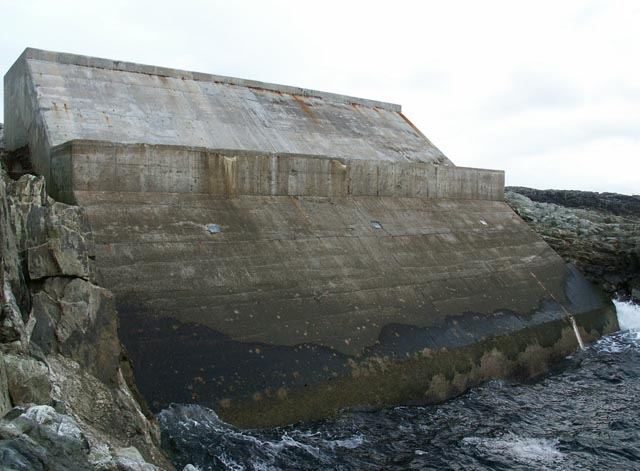
Close up view of the seaward face of LIMPET

A 75 kW prototype was constructed by Queen's University Belfast (QUB), starting in 1987 and completed by 1988. The mechanical and electrical plant for the prototype was commissioned in 1991, with alternative turbine configurations tested in 1995 and 1996.

The commercial Islay LIMPET was developed and operated by Wavegen in cooperation with QUB. It was located adjacent to the previous prototype, on the southern tip of the west coast of Islay, near Claddach Farm on the Rhinns of Islay, just north of Portnahaven.

Construction started in 1998 and was fully commissioned by 2001. Initially rated at 500 kW, the capacity was later downgraded to 250 kW. In the first winter after construction, the project was hit by 50-year extreme waves, and survived.

== Technology ==
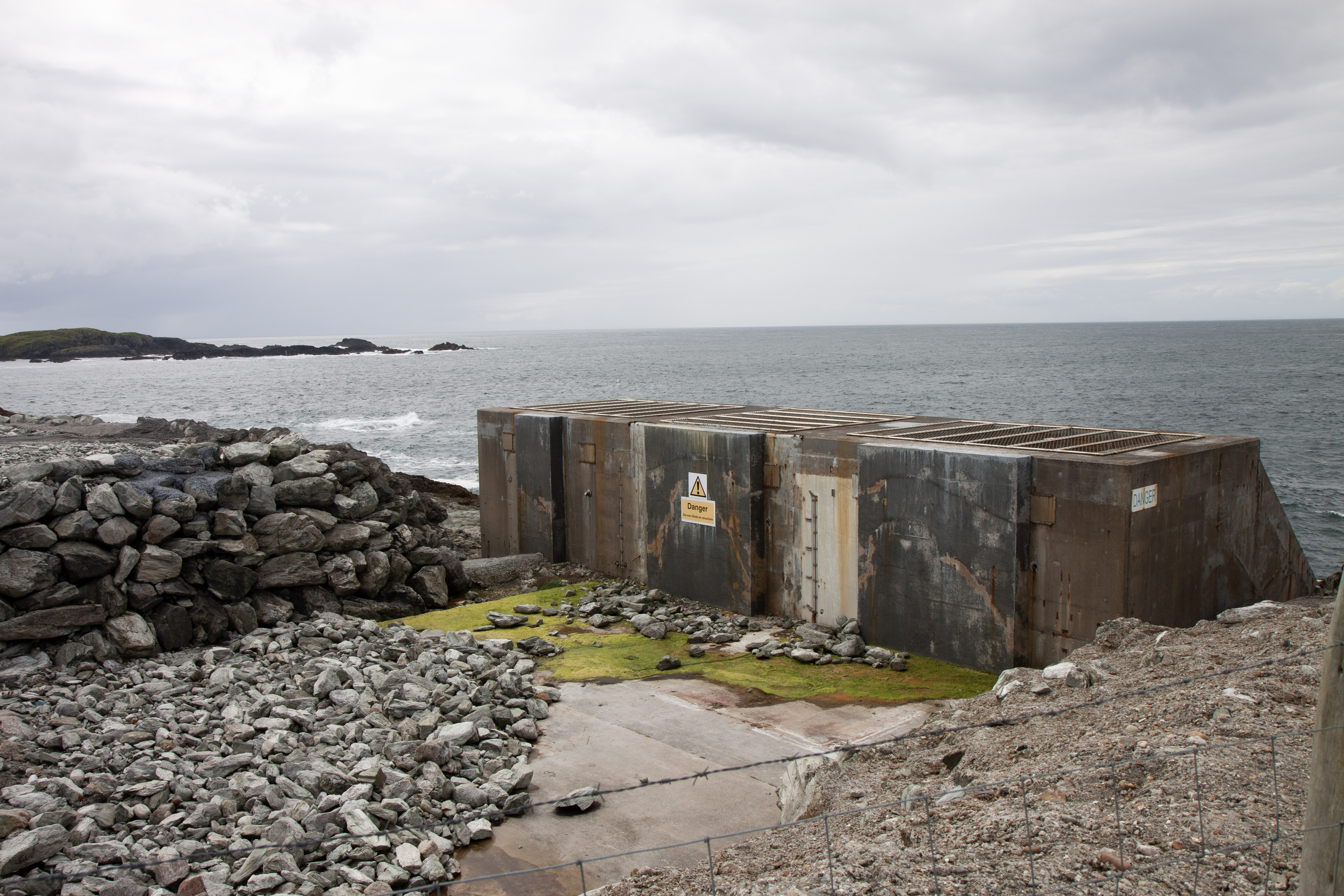
LIMPET with all installations removed except the wave chamber (8 August 2018)

Islay LIMPET was a shoreline device using an oscillating water column to drive air in and out of a pressure chamber through a Wells self-rectifying turbine.

The chamber of the LIMPET was an inclined concrete tube, with three sections each 6m by 6m. The opening was below the water level, and external wave action causes the water level in the chamber to oscillate. This variation in water level alternately compresses and decompresses trapped air above, which causes air to flow backwards and forwards through a pair of contra-rotating turbines.

The plant could be remotely operated from the Wavegen offices in Inverness, or from QUB in Belfast by ISDN links.

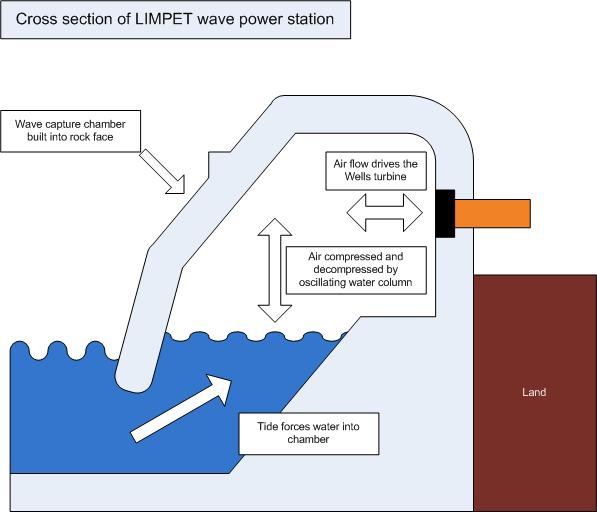
Details of how the wave power station operates

== Decommissioning ==
The plant was decommissioned in 2011, and as of 2018 all installations except the concrete construction making up the wave chamber have been removed.

== Related installations ==
Based on this design, a 16-turbine plant was built in the Bay of Biscay in Spain, the Mutriku Breakwater Wave Plant, which was fully operational and handed over to the Basque Utility, Ente Vasco de la Energía (EVE) in 2011.
