= Jógvan Poulsen (1854–1941) =

Faroese teacher and politician

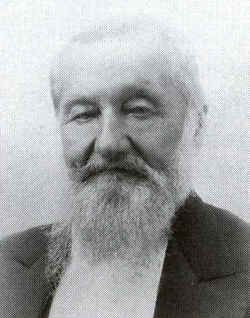
- Born: February 19, 1854; Svínáir, Faroe Islands
- Died: January 21, 1941 (aged 86); Strendur, Faroe Islands
- Occupations: Teacher, writer, politician
- Title: Member of the Faroese Parliament
- Term: 1883–1928
- Political party: Union Party

Jógvan Poulsen (February 19, 1854 –January 21, 1941) was a Faroese teacher and writer, and a politician for the Union Party.

Poulsen was born in Svínáir on Eysturoy, the son of Poul Joensen and Birgithe Joensen (née Thomasdatter). His parents originally came from Eiði and Funningur, respectively, and Svínáir was a new "settlement village" (Faroese: niðursetubygd) when they moved there. Jógvan Poulsen grew up in a poor home, and eventually served as a farmhand living at the Látrinan farm in Eiði. In 1874 he moved to Tórshavn to obtain an education.

He graduated as a teacher from the Faroese Teachers School in 1876 and taught at the primary schools in Strendur, Selatrað, Morskranes, and Skála until 1917. He gave up his teaching position because of illness. He published Förisk ABC og lesingabók (A Faroese ABC and Reader) together with Christian Ludvig Johannesen in 1891, but this was soon superseded by Hammershaimb's normative guide. Poulsen's Bibliusøga (Bible Stories) from 1900 became a standard work because the Bible had not yet been translated into Faroese. Poulsen was a board member of the Faroese Teachers' Association from 1898 to 1903 and from 1906 to 1912, and later a member of the school committee for the Faroe Islands from 1924 to 1928.

Poulsen was a council member for the former Parish Municipality of Eysturoy, and later for the Municipality of Sjóvar, and he served as mayor for a time. He served in the Faroese Parliament as a representative from Eysturoy from 1883 to 1928, and he was affiliated with the Union Party after 1906. He ran as a candidate from the Faroes for the Højre party for the Danish Parliament's lower house (the Folketing) in 1901, but he lost all of the constituencies except Eysturoy to Jóannes Patursson, with a result of 356 votes for Patursson and 199 for Poulsen. Poulsen was an opponent of the parliamentary system and supported the king's right to designate ministers, and he did not want the Faroese language conflict to play a role in the electoral campaign. He tried to present himself as the candidate representing the average citizen, and Patursson as the candidate representing wealthy farmers. Poulsen succeeded only partially in doing so because for many voters the Højre party appeared to represent the interests of government officials.

Poulsen died in Strendur. He was depicted on a Faroese stamp in 2008.
