= Oyster wave energy converter =

Hydro-electric generator using wave energy

Coordinates: 58.972°N 3.350°W

The Oyster was a hydro-electric wave energy device that used the motion of ocean waves to generate electricity. It was made up of a Power Connector Frame (PCF), which is bolted to the seabed, and a Power Capture Unit (PCU). The PCU is a hinged buoyant flap that moves back and forth with movement of the waves. The movement of the flap drives two hydraulic pistons that feed high-pressured water to an onshore hydro-electric turbine, which drives a generator to make electricity. Oyster was stationed at the European Marine Energy Centre (EMEC) at its Billia Croo site in Orkney, Scotland until the company ceased trading in 2015.

Aquamarine Power installed Oyster at the EMEC in August 2009. On 20 November 2009, Oyster was officially launched and connected to the National Grid (UK) by the First Minister of Scotland, Alex Salmond.

Development work was started to build a more efficient and powerful second-generation device, Oyster 2.

== History ==
Oyster was developed by Edinburgh-based Aquamarine Power, a company that focuses on wave energy. The concept originated from research at Queen's University, Belfast, led by professor Trevor Whittaker, Head of the Wave Power Research Centre at Queen's. Aquamarine Power also teamed up with Renewable Technology Ventures Ltd (STVL), a subsidiary of Scottish and Southern Energy (SEE), to fund the Oyster project. Aquamarine Power was able to secure a £6.3m investment from Scottish Enterprise. In addition, Scottish Enterprises awarded Aquamarine Power a £3.15 million grant from the Wave and Tidal Energy: Research, Development and Demonstration Support fund (WATERS). Aquamarine Power also received £1.5m from Sigma Capital Group plc. Altogether, Aquamarine Power was able to raise £11 million to stage this project.

In June 2009, Aquamarine Power signed a £2.5 million contract with Fugro Seacore to install the Oyster device at the European Marine Energy Centre test site at Billia Croo. Oyster was installed 400 metres offshore, west of the Orkney mainland, in 12 metre-deep water. Oyster was installed in August 2009; however it was officially launched on 20 November 2009 by the First Minister of Scotland, Alex Salmond. That same day, Oyster was connected the National Grid (UK) and began generating electricity.

Aquamarine Power hoped to commercialize Oyster and signed an agreement with Scottish and Southern Energy to develop up to 1000MW of wave farms by 2020. However, the test programme ended in 2015, when the company failed to find investors and ceased trading.

== Operation ==
Oyster harnessed the energy of near-shore ocean waves; it was designed to operate in water 10 to 12 metres deep. The Oyster is made up of a Power Connector Frame (PCF) and a Power Capture Unit (PCU). The 36-ton PCF is bolted to the seabed by 1-by-4 meter concrete piles that are drilled 14 metres deep into the seabed. The PCF requires careful and accurate positioning and leveling to compensate for the uneven, rocky seabed. The PCU is a 200-ton, 18-by-12-by-4 metre buoyant flap that is hinged to the PCF. In order to lower the PCU into the water to hinge it to the PCF, 120 tons of seawater must be pumped into ballast tanks within the PCU to provide sufficient negative buoyancy to aid its descent into the water. The PCU is almost entirely submerged underwater; only 2 metres of the device poke above the water. The PCU sways back and forth with the movement of the waves, and this movement of the flap drives two hydraulic pistons that pump high-pressured water through three sub-sea pipeline to an onshore hydro-electric water turbine. The turbine then drives a 315 kW electrical generator, which converts the wave energy into electricity.

The European Marine Energy Centre classifies Oyster as an Oscillating Wave Surge Converter:

This device extracts the energy caused by wave surges and the movement of water particles within them. The arm oscillates as a pendulum mounted on a pivoted joint in response to the movement of water in the waves.

== Potential ==
There are several advantages to using a device like the Oyster:

- Oyster itself has few moving parts underwater. Its simplicity allows for survivability: in extreme weather conditions, Oyster's hinged flap can simply move and duck under large waves.
- Because all of Oyster's electrical components are located onshore, the hydro-electric generator is accessible for maintenance 24/7. The actual Oyster device is near shore, making it easily accessible, as well.
- Oyster used renewable energy from ocean waves to generates clean, zero-emission electricity. This minimizes the environmental risks involved compared to electricity that is produced from fossil fuels. The Carbon Trust estimated that each Oyster device can avoid over 500 tons of carbon dioxide from being released into the atmosphere annually.
- Aquamarine Power estimated that a farm of 20 Oyster units could produce enough energy to power 9,000 homes.
- According to the Aquamarine Power's CEO Martin McAdam:

A successful Oyster project would unlock £3-4 million of capital expenditure per MW installed, of which a significant proportion would be invested in the Orkney economy. A commercial wave farm could therefore represent a significant boost to the local economy and would provide long-term skilled jobs for local residents. Ongoing operations and maintenance would generate a further £150,000 per annum to the local economy.

—

It was estimated in2008 that advances in the marine energy industry could provide as many as 12,500 jobs, contributing £2.5 billion to the UK economy by 2020.
- Aquamarine Power hoped to commercialize and expand the Oyster technology. Ronan Doherty, Chief Technical Officer of Aquamarine Power, found that coastlines off Spain, Portugal, Ireland, Britain, United States, South Africa, Australia and Chile have great wave energy potential and would be ideal places to install Oyster. Doherty predicted that the Oyster market has a £50 billion potential.

== Challenges ==
There are also many disadvantages to using a device like the Oyster:

- The installation and production of Oyster is difficult and expensive.
  - Oyster weighs over 200 tons; it must be carried out to sea in a large flat-top barge and installed in several stages. First, the PCF is lowered and bolted in the seabed, and it must be accurately positioned and leveled to compensate for the uneven seabed. Then, 120 tons of seawater must be pumped into ballast tanks within the PCU to provide sufficient negative buoyancy to aid its descent into the water to be hinged to the PCF. This complex process involves employing many workers and using expensive equipment.
  - To deploy more Oyster units, new cables will be needed to install the devices into the National Grid.
- Oyster's offshore turbine and generator can produce noise pollution, thereby disturbing onshore wildlife. However, most of this noise is expected to be masked by the surrounding noise generated by the wind and waves.
- The installation and operation of the Oyster could interfere with marine mammal life and fish life. The movement of the Oyster device produces underwater noise and vibrations. The noise can mask natural sounds (thus disturbing communication between marine wildlife), produce stress, and cause hearing loss in marine species.
- Deploying several Oyster units could result in loss of habitat for marine species.

== Oyster Version 2 ==
An improved second-generation Oyster device was developed; the Oyster 2 or Oyster 800 referring to its 800 kW rated capacity. In December 2010, Aquamarine Power signed a £4 million contract with Scotland's leading fabrication contractor Burntisland Fabrications Ltd (BiFab). BiFab began manufacturing Oyster 2 at its manufacturing plant in Methil, Fife, Scotland, and the device was grid connected at the European Marine Energy Centre in June 2012 where testing continued until 2015.

Aquamarine Power secured funding from many sources for the development of Oyster 2:

- In February 2010, Aquamarine Power received a grant of £5.1 million from the Marine Renewables Proving Fund (MRPF), which is funded by the United Kingdom's Department of Energy and Climate Change and managed by the Carbon Trust.
- Renewable Technology Ventures Ltd (STVL), a subsidiary of Scottish and Southern Energy (SEE), has invested an additional £2.7 million, bringing its total investment in Aquamarine Power to £19.8 million over the last three years.
- ABB, the automation and power technology company, has invested £8 million in Aquamarine Power.

Oyster 800 employed the same basic technology of the original Oyster; however, it will feature a different shape that will maximize the amount of energy that the device is able to capture from the waves. The original plan was for three 800 kW flaps that will all be linked to one pipeline leading to an onshore 2.4 MW hydro-electric generator. However, only one flap was installed. The flap measured 26 metres, making it 50% larger than the original Oyster. Aquamarine Power estimated that a small farm of 20 Oyster 2 devices would be capable of supplying enough electricity for over 12,000 homes, compared to the 9,000 homes the original Oyster is capable of powering.

At the European Marine Energy Centre's Billia Croo site, a single Oyster 800 rated at 800 kW was grid-connected in June 2012 and was tested until 2015. By mid 2014 the Oyster 800 had completed 20,000 hours of operation.

== See also ==
- Aquamarine Power
- European Marine Energy Centre
- Hydropower
- Marine energy
- Queen's University Belfast
- Wave power
