= SEV (company) =

Power producer and distributor on the Faroe Islands

- Type: ApS
- Industry: power generation
- Founded: 1946
- Founder: Municipalities of 3 islands of the Faroe Islands
- Headquarters: Tórshavn, Faroe Islands
- Key people: Hákun Djurhuus, CEO, Jákup Suni Lauritsen, president of the board
- Products: electric power
- Owner: All municipalities of the Faroe Islands
- Website: www.sev.fo

SEV is a power producer and distributor on the Faroe Islands. The company name is derived from the names of islands Streymoy, Eysturoy and Vágar, which established the company on 1 October 1946. All municipalities in Vágar, all in Eysturoy except for Sjóvar municipality and all municipalities in Streymoy except for Tórshavn, Kvívík and Kollafjørður met at the first establishing meeting. Later all municipalities in the Faroe Islands joined SEV. In 2015 60% of the produced electricity of SEV came from green energy sources, 17,8% came from the windmills in Neshagi and Húsahagi, 42,3% came was hydropower.

== History ==
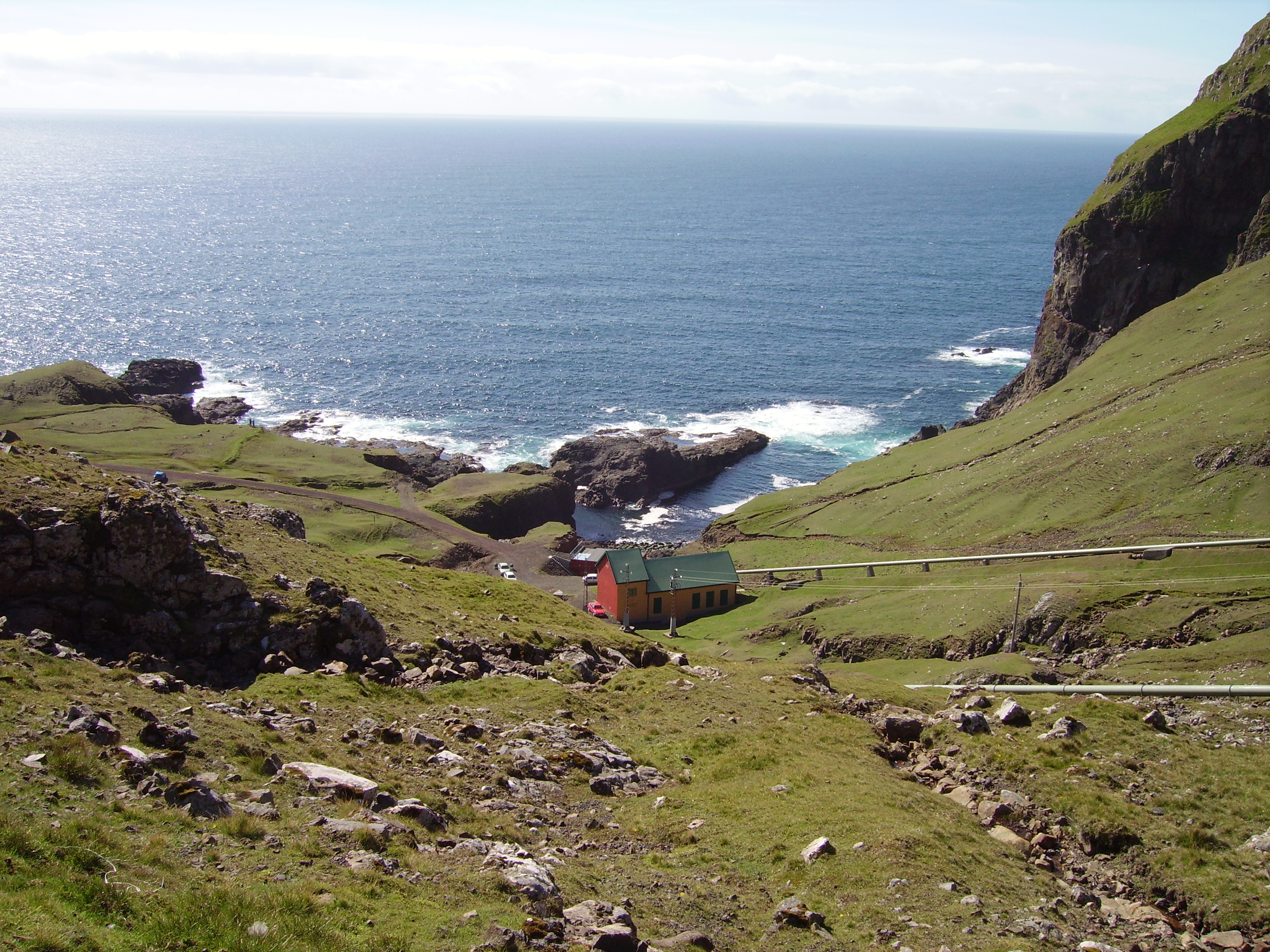
The first hydroelectric powerplant of the Faroe Islands, Botnur power plant, was built in Botni in Suðuroy in 1921. It is owned by SEV since 1963.

SEV was founded on 1 October 1946. The foundation meeting took place in Tórshavn and was attended by representatives from 19 municipalities from Streymoy, Eysturoy and Vágar. Gunnar Dahl Olsen who was sysselmann and mayor of Vestmanna was the first president of SEV. By 1963, all Faroe's municipalities had joined the company and transferred their own power production capacities to SEV.

In 2015, the company was awarded the Nordic Council Environment Prize.

== Activities ==
In November 2012 the Faroe Islands became the first place in the world where a virtual power plant (Power Hub) was used to recreate balance in an island power system by decoupling large industrial units in less than a second from the main power system, thereby avoiding blackouts.

As of 1 January 2016, 60% of total electricity produced in the Faroe Islands was generated by hydro or wind power, with 65% of the generated electricity before 21 June 2015 coming from renewables, this is an increase of 15% compared to the same period the year before, while at the same time electricity consumption has increased overall 5%. As the year ended it was revealed that 60% of consumed electricity in 2015 came from renewables.

SEV has exclusive rights to produce hydroelectricity and it operates nine large and seven smaller hydro electric plants.

SEV is also developing other sources of renewable energy. In 1993, the company started to research wind energy with the establishment of a wind turbine in Neshagi, above Toftir. In 2005, the number of operational wind turbines increased up to three. In addition, in 2003 SEV also signed a 10 years agreement to buy electricity from Sp/f Røkt, which operates three wind turbines in Mýrunum above Vestmanna. In 2012 five Enercon winturbines were set up in Neshagi and running.

The windfarm in Húshagi, came officially online on 9 October 2014. The 13 wind turbines on Húsahaga from ENERCON have a total production capacity of 11.7 MW, generating annually some 41 GWh. The windmills produce about 23% of the electricity of the Faroe Islands.

SEV's oil consumption decreased by 4,100 tonnes over the period January to June 2015, compared to the same period in 2014. Electricity production from oil decreased by 26.6% for the first half of 2015, compared to the same period last year.

SEV, Icelandic New Energy, and the authorities in the Faroe Islands and Greenland have established the North Atlantic Hydrogen Association to investigate hydrogen technology. In co-operation with the municipality of Vestmanna, SEV investigates possibilities to develop a solar power system. Together with Wavegen, a Scottish leading wave energy company, SEV develops the SeWave wave farm project in Nípan. Although SEV does not have the electricity distribution monopoly by law, it is the only company who supplies electricity on the Faroe Islands.

SEV has been setting a target of the islands being 100% supplied by renewable electricity by 2030.

== Power plants ==
SEV owns and operates 13 various power plants, of these, 3 are thermal, the Strond-, Sund- and Vágur plants.

6 are Hydroelectric, the Strond-, Eiðis-, Fossá-, Mýru- and Heyga plants, as well as the plant in Botni.

In addition to these there are five smaller thermal plants providing power for Fugloy, Mykines, Koltur, Skúvoy and Stóru Dímun, these five are not connected to the main grid and only supply the individual islands and communities. None having engines exceeding 80 kW.

SEV has 5 ENERCON E44(900 kW) wind turbines in Neshagi, on Eysturoy and 13 ENERCON E44 turbines in Húsahagi, Streymoy. The company Røkt owns 3 Vestas V47(660 kW) turbines in Vestmanna, however SEV buys and distributes the power produced there.

Three Vestas V47 turbines were put up in Neshagi in 2005, but in the winter 2011/2012 two of them were wrecked during a storm and it was decided to take the last one down, two ENERCON E44 turbines were put up in their place.

SEV has formed agreement with Swedish tidal-kite firm Minesto for installing paravane-based electricity generation. Two 100 kW Dragon 4 turbines were installed at Vestmannasund in the Faroe Islands in 2022, joined in February 2024 by a larger 1.2 MW Dragon 12, all powering the Faroese grid.

== Management ==
The board of SEV consists of seven members. Since 2007, CEO of the company is Hákun Djurhuus. Before that, Hjalgrím Winther (1953–1983) and Klæmint Weihe (1983–2007) served as CEO of the company. President of the board is Jákup Suni Lauritsen since November 2011. Before that Páll á Reynatúgvu was the president of the board, but he had to resign when he was elected for the Løgting.

== See also ==
- Energy in the Faroe Islands
- Economy of the Faroe Islands
- List of companies of the Faroe Islands
