= Eiði =

- Village
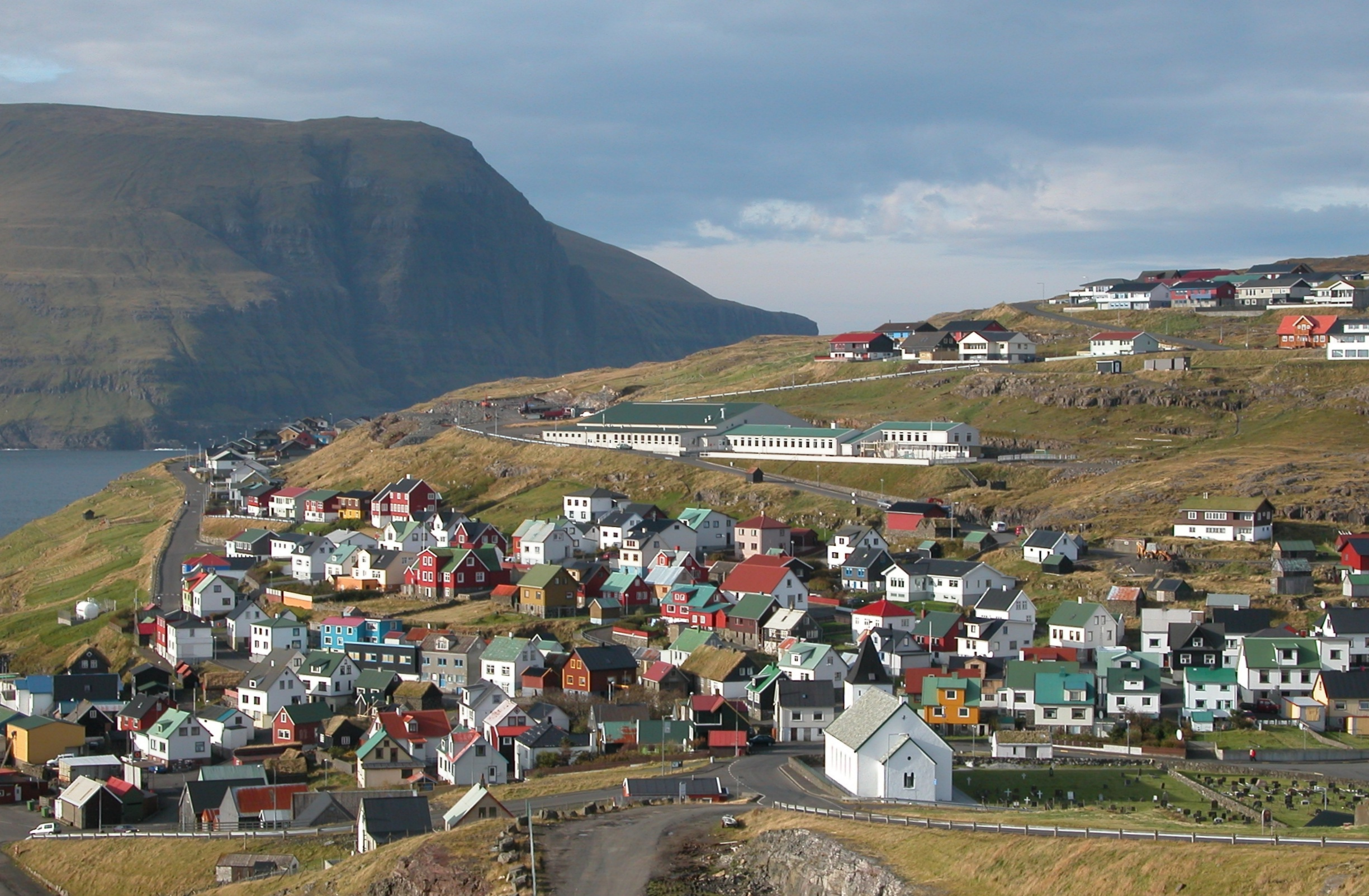
- Eiði

- Location in the Faroe Islands
- Coordinates: 62°17′57″N 7°5′25″W
- State: Denmark
- Constituent country: Faroe Islands
- Region: Eysturoy
- Municipality: Eiði

Population (September 2025)
  - Total: 699
- Time zone: UTC±00:00 (WET)
  - Summer (DST): UTC+01:00 (WEST)
- Postal code: 470
- Climate: Cfc

Eiði [ˈaiːjɪ] (Northern Faroese [ˈɔiːjɪ];) is a village located on the north-west tip of Eysturoy in the Faroe Islands. It is the seat of Eiði Municipality. It is located 4 km north of Ljósá and 6.5 km west of Funningur.

== History ==
Eiði was first mentioned in writing early in the 14th century. Eiði was settled by Norsemen. The earliest sign of settlement was carbondated to approx. 920 CE. Settlement is likely to have happened earlier. In the centre of the village is Eiði Church. It was founded on September 18, 1881, and was designed in 1879 by Danish architect Hans Christian Amberg.

The LORAN-C transmitter Ejde was previously located just east of Eiði. The transmitter was deemed obsolete in 2015 and was turned off for the final time on 1 January, 2016 and dismantled three years later. It was an important station for submarine navigation during the Cold War. At its peak in the 1960s, the station employed 32 workers.

== Sports ==
The village's football team is EB/Streymur. It was founded 1993 as a merger between Eiðis Bóltfelag and Ítróttarfelagið Streymur.

== Notable residents ==
- Grækaris Joensen (1835–1897), teacher, politician and the first mayor of the municipality
- Hans Pauli Samuelsen (born 1984), football player
- Arnbjørn Hansen (born 1986), football player
- Doris Olafsdóttir (born 1986), football player
