= Von dem Knesebeck =

Knesebeck Coat of Arms

Knesebeck most often refers to:

- The German noble family von dem Knesebeck
- Karl Friedrich von dem Knesebeck, Prussian Field Marshal, credited with planning the Battle of the Nations (1768–1848)

== Places ==
- Knesebeck, Germany

== People with the name ==
- Thomas von dem Knesebeck, Privy Councillor and Landeshauptmann (Governor) of the Altmark (1559–1625)
- Karl Friedrich von dem Knesebeck, Prussian Field Marshal, credited with planning the Battle of the Nations (1768–1848)
- Alfred von dem Knesebeck, Major in the Gardes du Corps, Member of the Reichstag (1816-1883)
