= House of Knesebeck =

Knesebeck
- Country: (Germany)
- Founded: c. 1244
- Founder: Bodo de Knesebeke and Wasmod de Knesebeke
- Current head: Krafft Freiherr von dem Knesebeck-Milendonck
- Titles: Baron; Junker

The House of Knesebeck is the name of two branches of a prominent aristocratic family in the tradition of the ancient nobility in Germany. In the 17th century they acknowledged a common ancestry and combined their arms. The black line of the family von dem Knesebeck stems from the ancient nobility of Lower Saxony, while the white line stems from the ancient nobility of the Altmark. Branches of both lines remain to this day. As one of the leading Prussian Junker families, it has produced numerous senior military and public figures. These have included ambassadors, bishops, governors, members of parliament, a field marshal, and dozens of generals.

== History ==
=== Origin ===
The castle of Knesebeck in Lower Saxony was jointly established by the first Duke of Brunswick and the Margrave of Brandenburg in 1236, as a defence against the Slavs. Each appointed a knight to man the fortress, who then both took their name from the castle, as was common at the time. The first documented mention in the black line is of a Wasmodos von dem Knesebeck in 1248. From 1374 the family held the position of hereditary chamberlain of the Principality of Lüneburg.

The first documented mention of the white line is of Bodo de Soltwedele in 1207. He was governor and constable in Salzwedel, from which he initially took his name. He is first mentioned as de Knesebeke on 26 January 1244 as a witness in a document for the Margraves Johann and Otto of Brandenburg.

=== Rise ===
In 1281 Pariadmus miles dictus de Knesebecke appears as donor of an altar to St Spiritus in the convent of Diesdorf, while the brothers Boldewinus and Paridam de Knesebeck are mentioned as selling the estate of Mackstorf to the convent of Dambeck in 1283. In 1338 the family became vassals of Margrave Louis I of Brandenburg, in exchange for providing ten men in armour and forty armed with spears. In 1374 Werner von dem Knesebeck was awarded the position of chamberlain of the Principality of Lüneburg, which his grandfather hat first held, as a hereditary office.

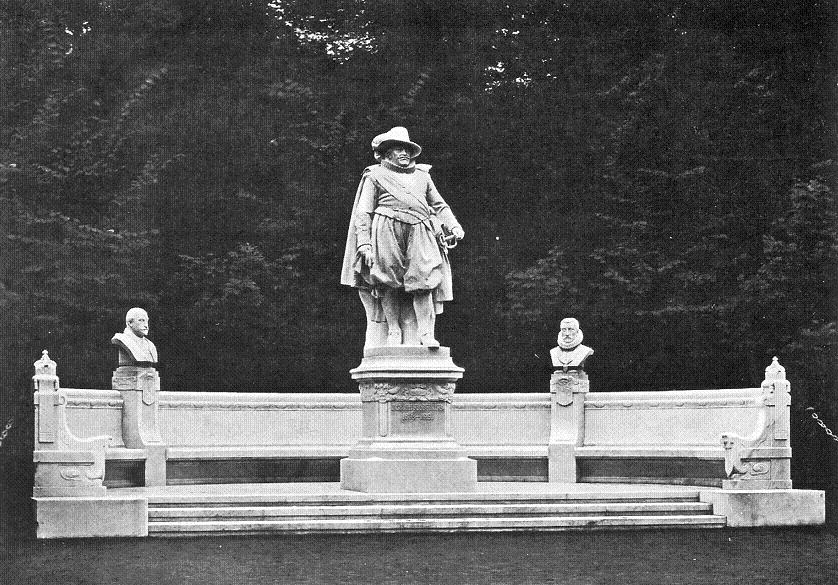
Thomas von dem Knesebeck to the right of John Sigismund, Elector of Brandenburg on the Siegesallee

From 1380 the house of Knesebeck together with the families Alvensleben, Bartensleben, Bismarck, Jagow, Platen, Schenck and Schulenburg, belonged to the eight most prominent families in the Altmark ranked as "schlossgesessen", meaning lords of castles guaranteed legal privileges. They were directly answerable to the Landeshauptmann (Governor) and were given the title "Edle", as members of the military class. These families intermarried heavily. During the 15th century, the Knesebeck, Schulenburg and Alvensleben families were further granted the right of coinage, which they exercised.

Numerous members of the white line rose to senior positions in Brandenburgish and later Prussian military and public service. In 1440 Paridam von dem Knesebeck served as Prince-Bishop of Ratzeburg, while in 1464 Matthias von dem Knesebeck became Prelate of the Benedictine Ebstorf Abbey, having previously served as secretary and chancellor to the Dukes of Brunswick. Ludolf von dem Knesebeck joined Vasco da Gama as a captain on his exploration of the sea route to India in 1497. Thomas von dem Knesebeck (1559–1625) rose to Landeshauptmann (Governor) of the Altmark and was instrumental in introducing the Reformation to Brandenburg. In 1901 he was honoured with inclusion among the statues of the Siegesallee, as a bust next to John Sigismund, Elector of Brandenburg. His son Thomas would also go on to hold the position of Landeshauptmann, as did another son Hempo von dem Knesebeck (1595–1656), who was previously diplomat and Master of the Horse to Christian I. of Anhalt.

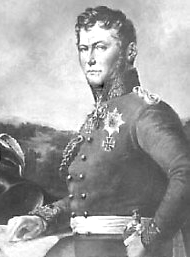
Field Marshal Karl Friedrich von dem Knesebeck

The most famous member of the family is Karl Friedrich von dem Knesebeck, who was chief military advisor to Frederick William III of Prussia during the Napoleonic Wars and rose to the rank of field marshal. He is best known for his diplomatic role maintaining a Russo-Prussian alliance and for designing the campaign plan of the Battle of Leipzig and the subsequent invasion of France. In light of his services he was offered elevation to Graf (Earl), but declined, preferring to retain his Freiherr title. His son, Alfred, became a member of the Prussian House of Representatives and the Reichstag of the North German Confederation. His service was recognised by the joining the barony of Milendonck to that of Knesebeck. The Milendonck family had married into the Knesebeck family in the early 18th century, but had since become extinct. The joining was granted by royal decree on 10 March 1870.

Among notable members of the black line were Friedrich August Wilhelm von dem Knesebeck (1775–1842), Hanoverian Major-General, and his sons Major-General Bernhard (1817–1887) and Lieutenant-General Ernst Julius Georg von dem Knesebeck (1809–1869). Bernhard von dem Knesebeck rose to prominence as a senior field commander during the Austro-Prussian War (1866) and the Franco-Prussian War (1871) and later as Commandant of Erfurt; his brother Ernst Julius Georg von dem Knesebeck served on the general staff and as ambassador to the Bavarian and Württemberg courts. His son Bodo von dem Knesebeck (1851–1911), rose to Imperial Chamberlain and Master of Ceremonies, Secretary of the Order of the Black Eagle and founder and first President of the German Red Cross. His other son Lionel von dem Knesebeck (1849–1916), served as Hofmarschall to Prince Frederick Charles of Hesse, the last King of Finland.

A number of family members were highly decorated during the Second World War. This included Colonel Wasmod von dem Knesebeck, who was awarded the highest military award, the Knight's Cross of the Iron Cross, while serving as Chief of Staff of the 306th Infantry Division. Furthermore, Colonel Klaus von dem Knesebeck, Chief of Staff of the 65th Infantry Division, and Captain Krafft von dem Knesebeck were both awarded the second highest military award, the German Cross in Gold, the latter just days before being fatally wounded. He had been recommended for the Knight's Cross, but this was downgraded.

Of particular note among the women of the family is Friedrike Wilhelmine von dem Knesebeck (1750–1802), daughter of the Lieutenant-Colonel and Adjutant-General Carl Christoph Johann von dem Knesebeck, a lady-in-waiting to Queen Sophia Dorothea of Prussia. While riding in a carriage in Berlin her horses bolted, upon which she promptly jumped from the speeding vehicle. Frederick the Great was so impressed by her courage that he penned a two-page poem in French, describing her as "braver than Penthesilea". The court painter Adolph von Menzel produced an engraving of the incident.

Three streets and a bridge in Berlin are named after the family.

=== Properties ===
At various times the family has held the properties of Knesebeck, Tylsen, Karwe, Myllendonk, Huysburg, Röderhof, Osseg, Wall, Frohnenbruch, Hoerstgen, Dömnitz, Badekow, Gresse, Dambeck, Löwenbruch, Jühnsdorf, Langenapel, Döre, Fürstenau, Butow, Brome, Wittingen, Corvin, Woltersdorf and Colborn.

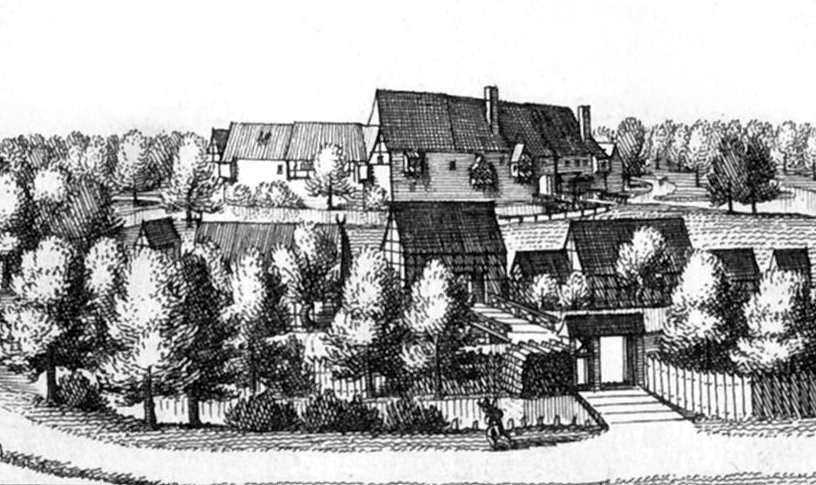
Castle Knesebeck

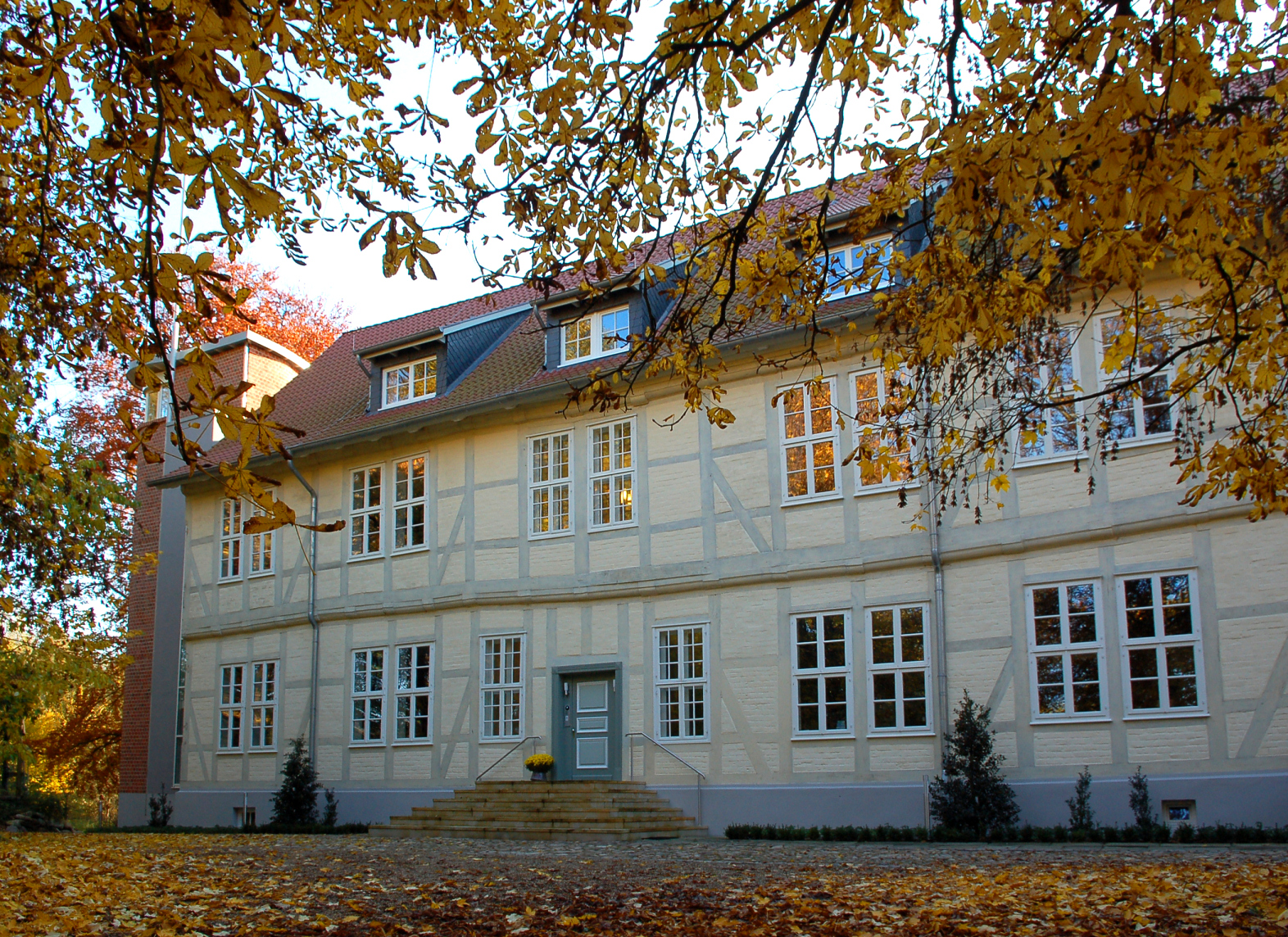
Estate managers house, Castle Knesebeck

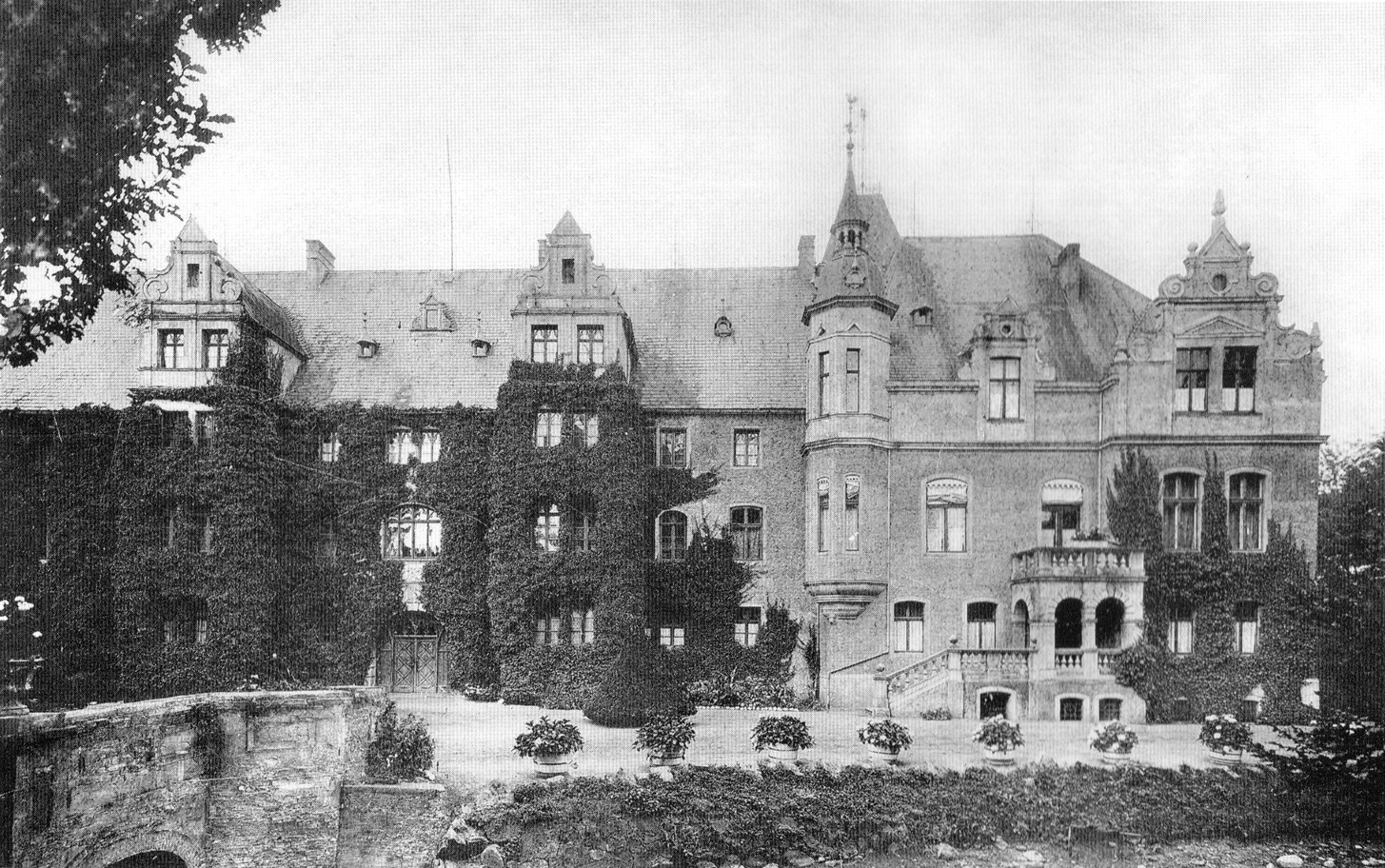
Schloss Tylsen

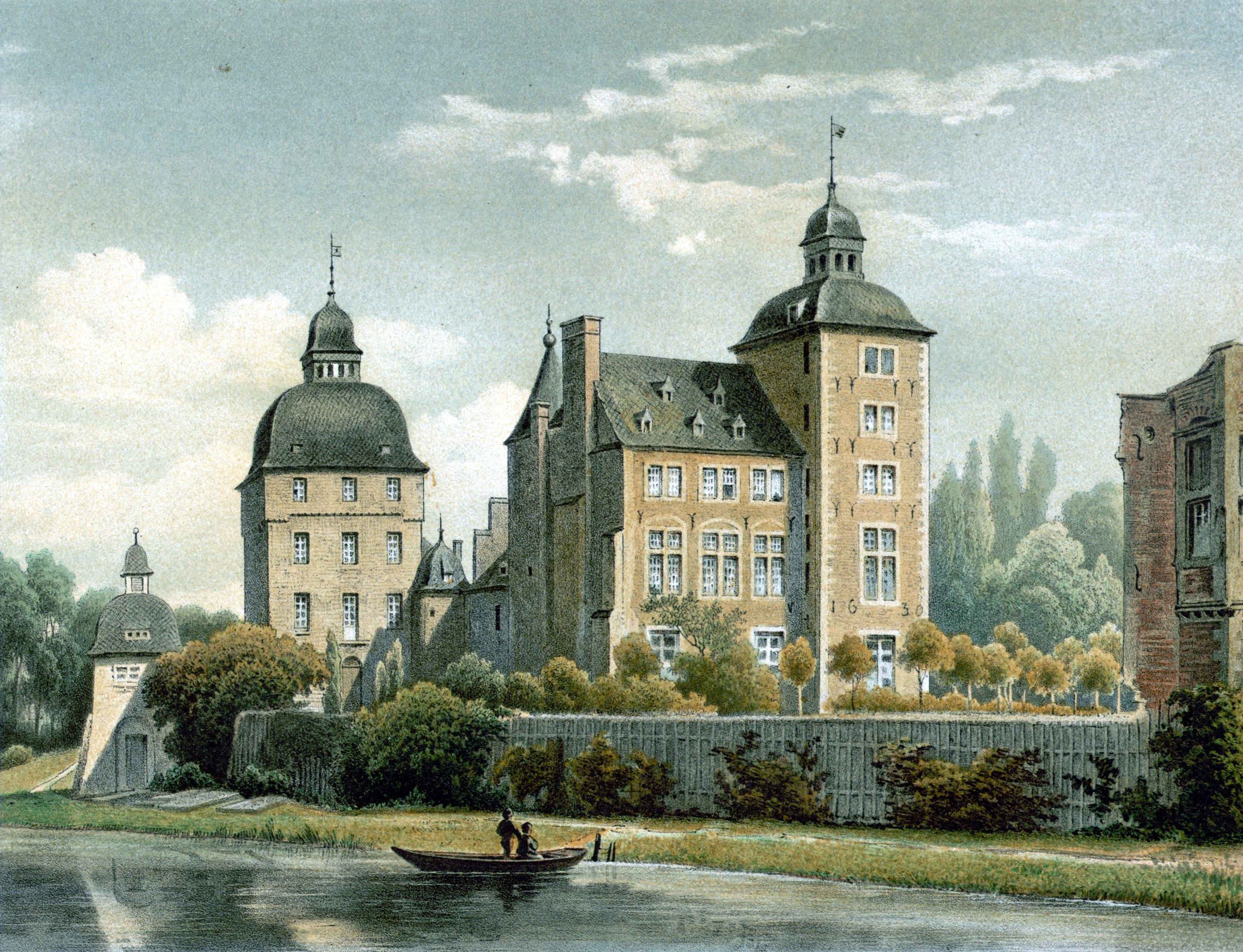
Schloss Myllendonk

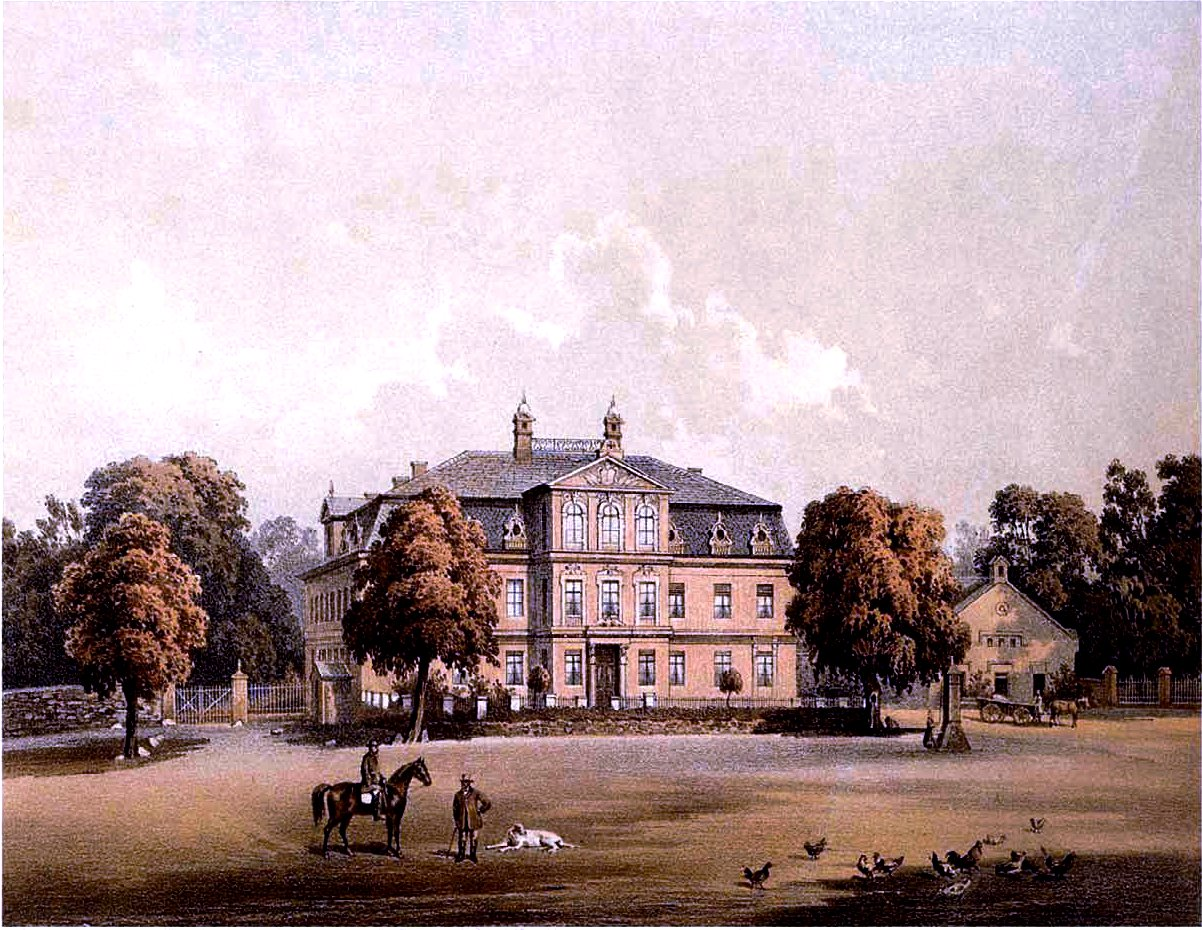
Schloss Karwe

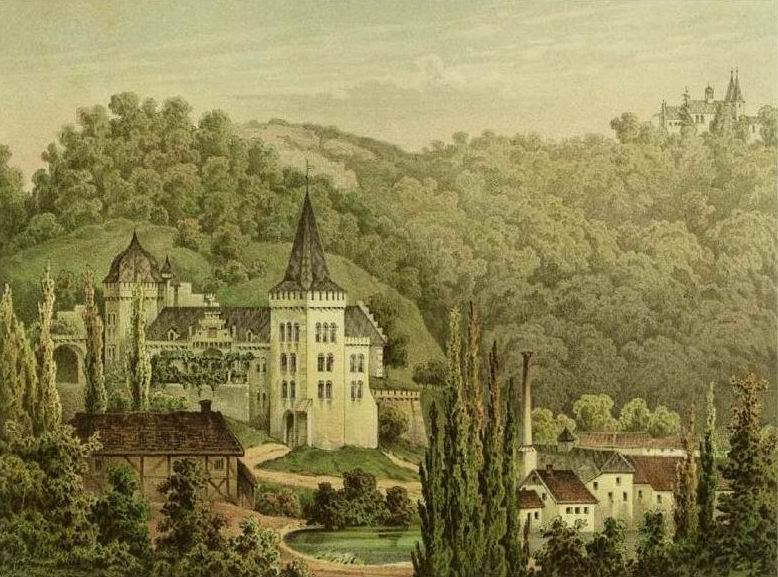
Röderhof Castle

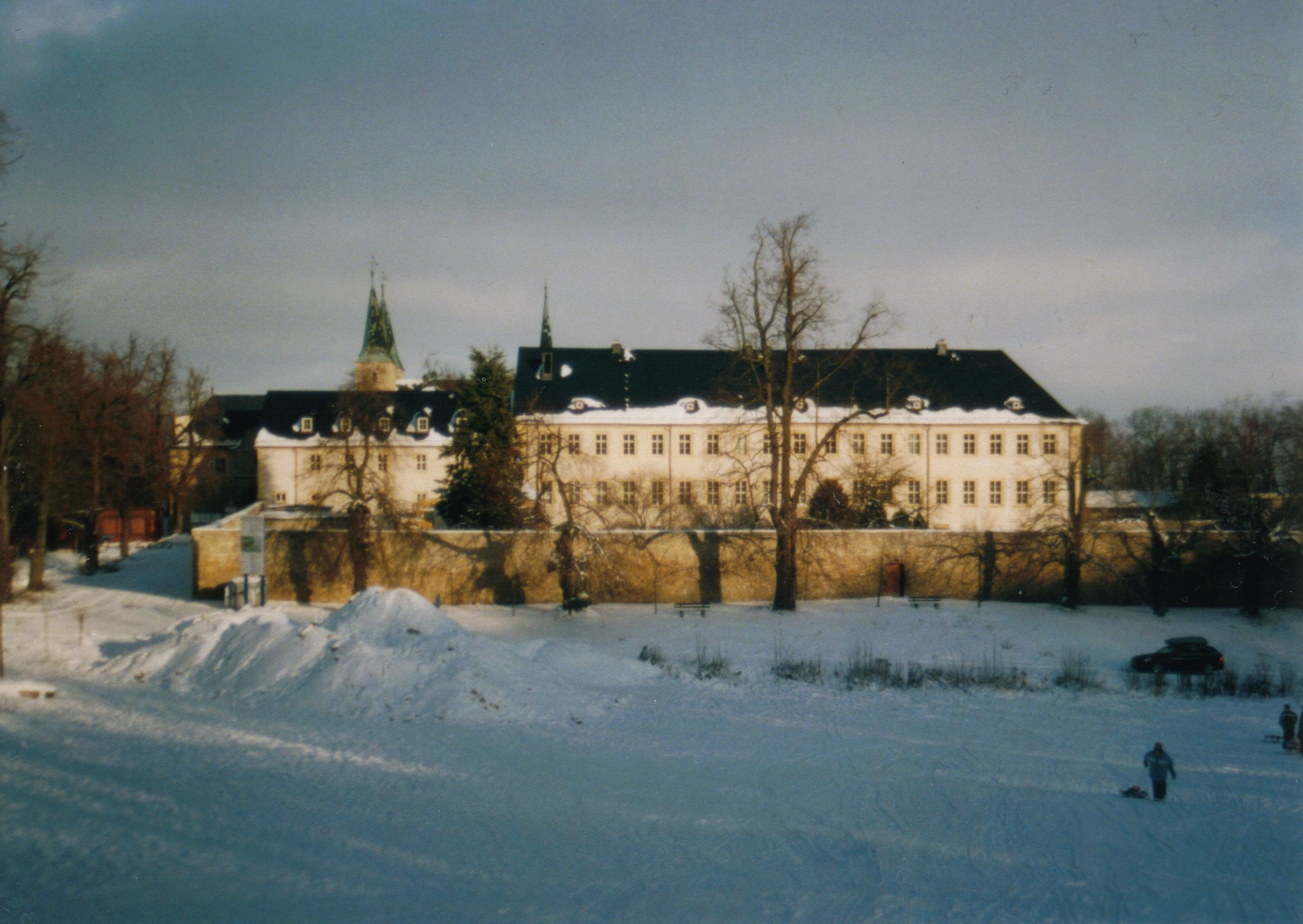
Huysburg Castle

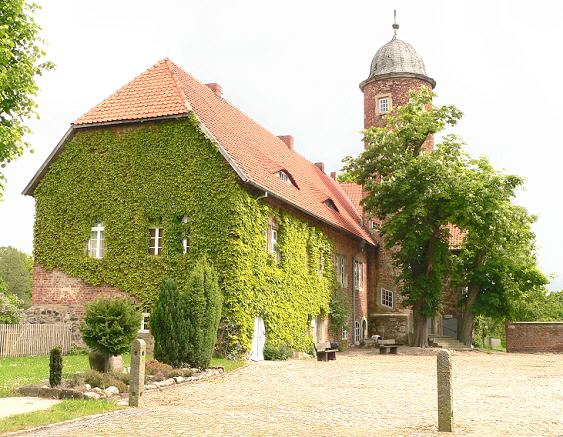
Burg Brome

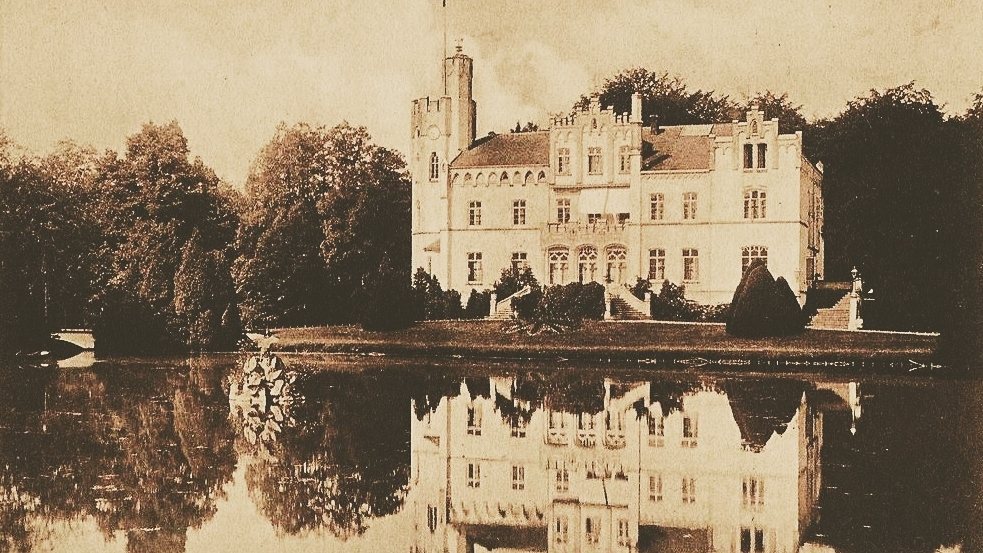
Castle Gresse

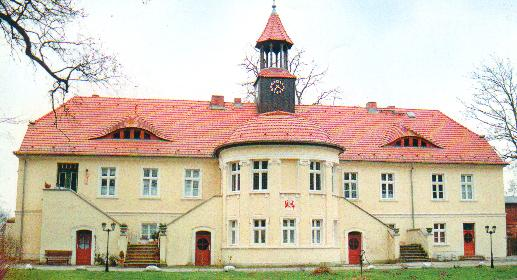
Herrenhaus Wall

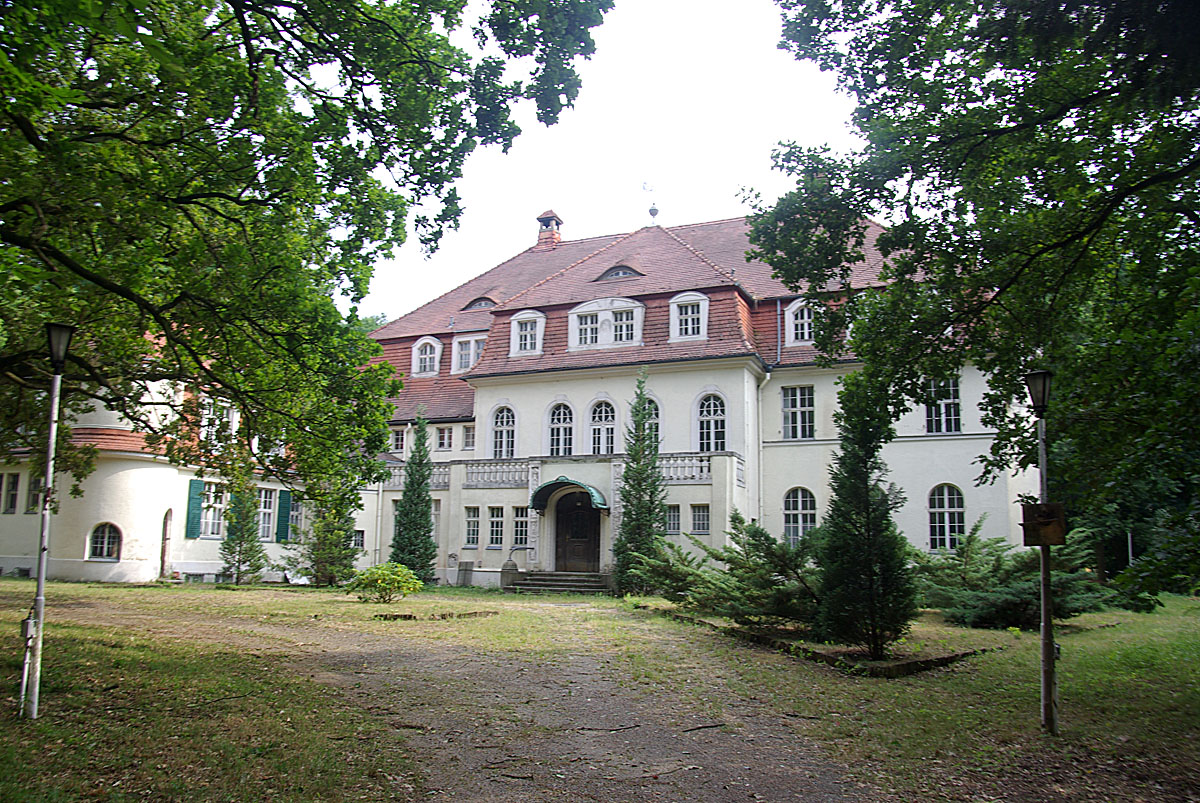
Herrenhaus Bagenz

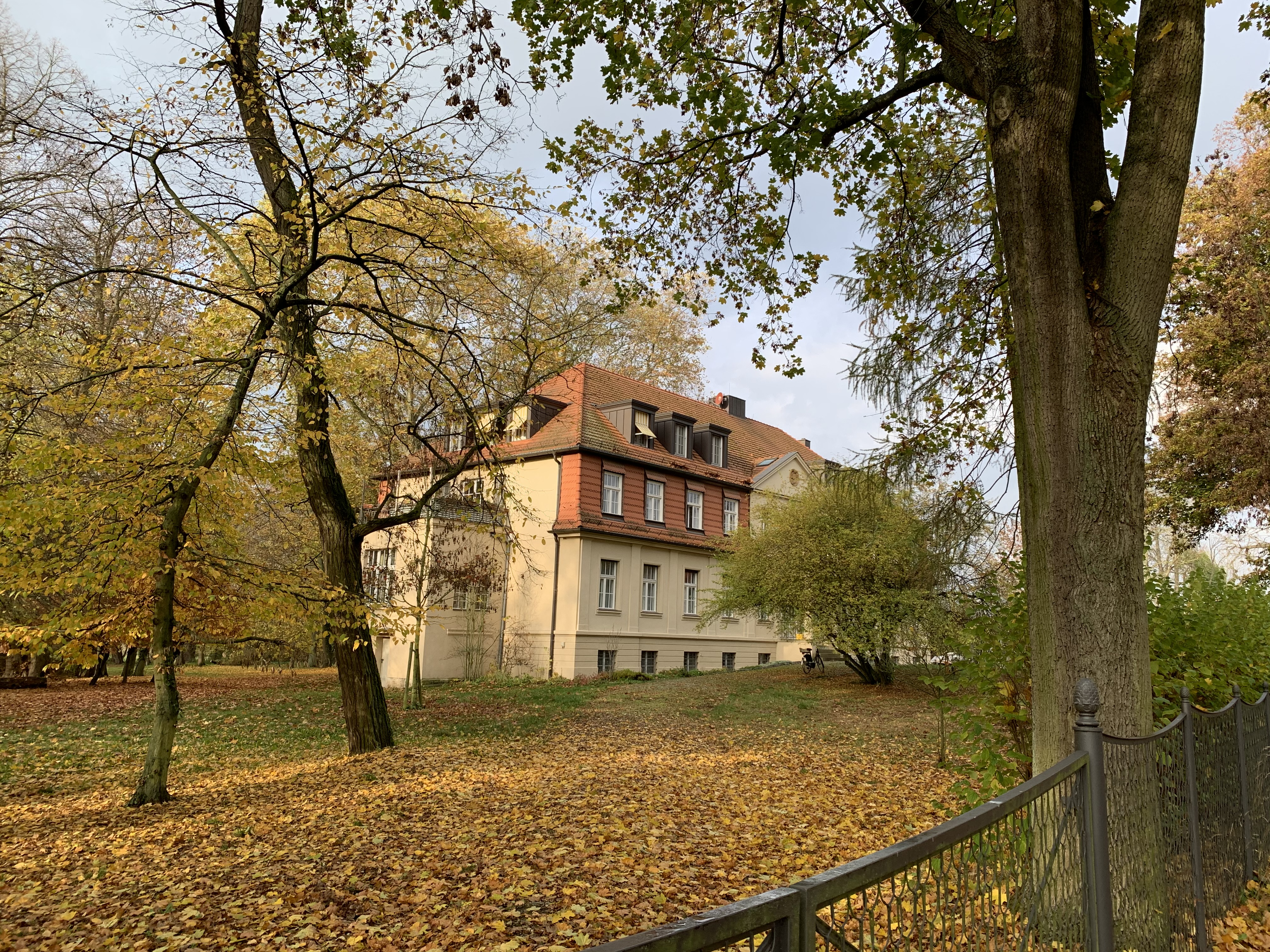
Gutshaus Jühnsdorf

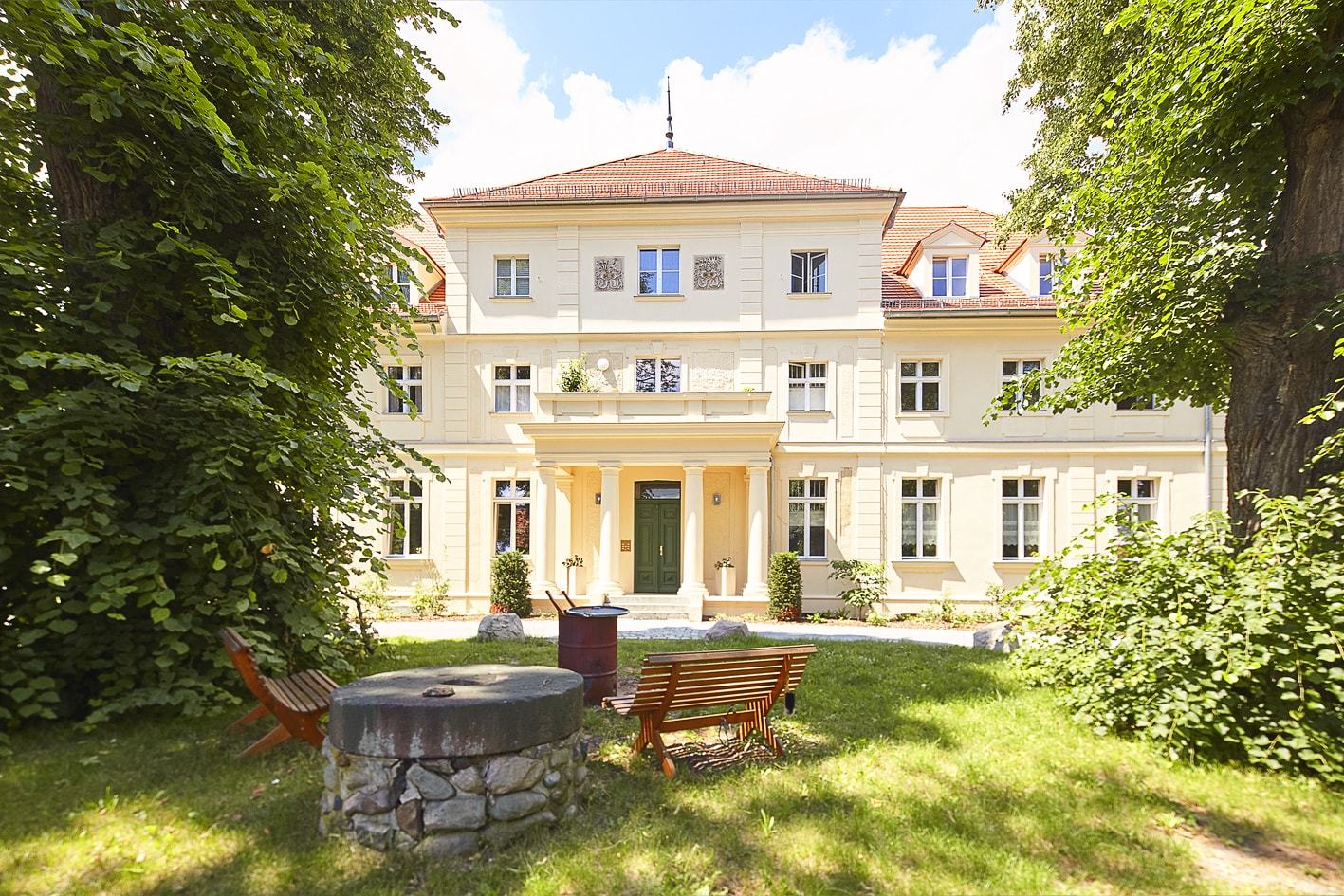
Gutshaus Löwenbruch

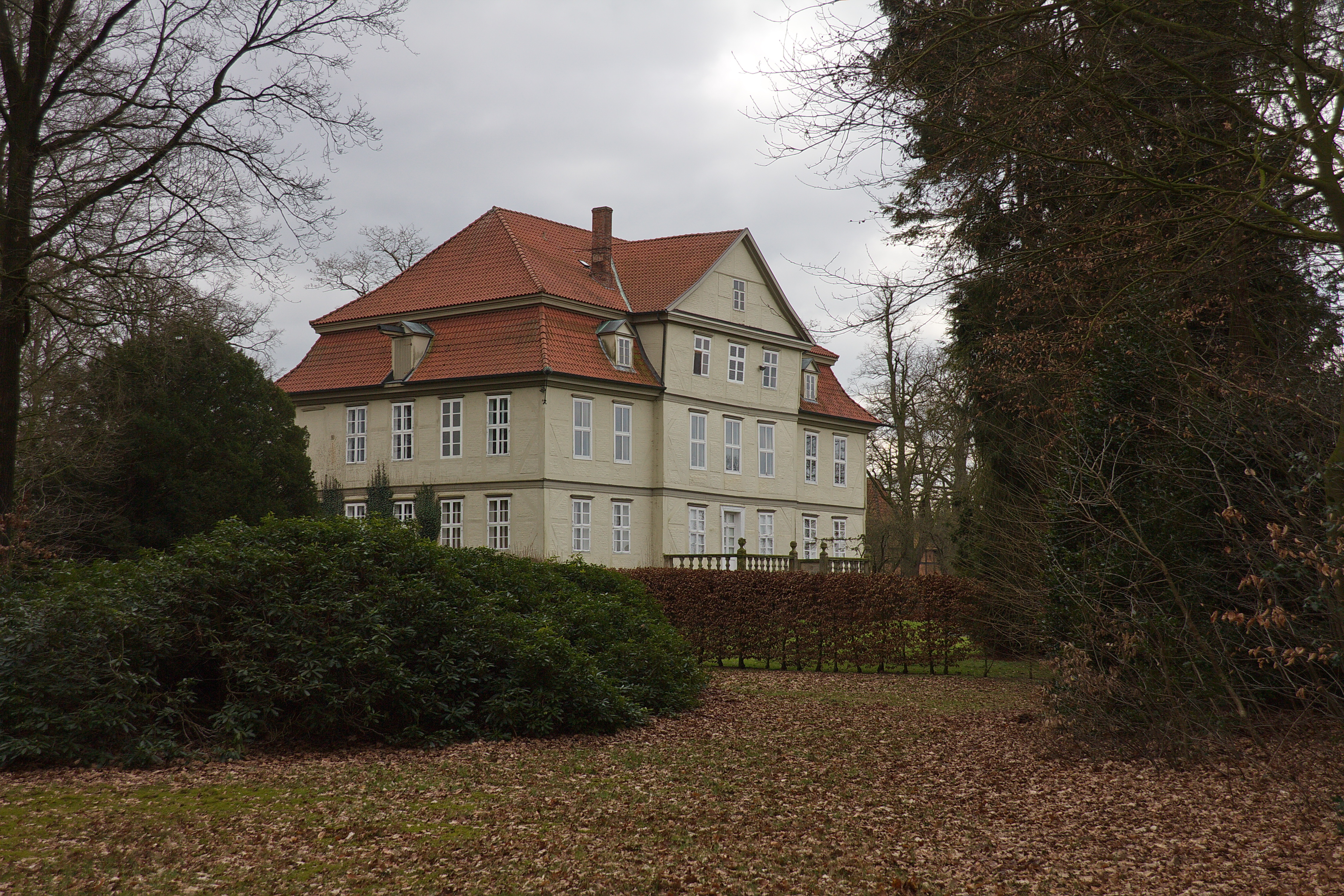
Rittergut Böhme

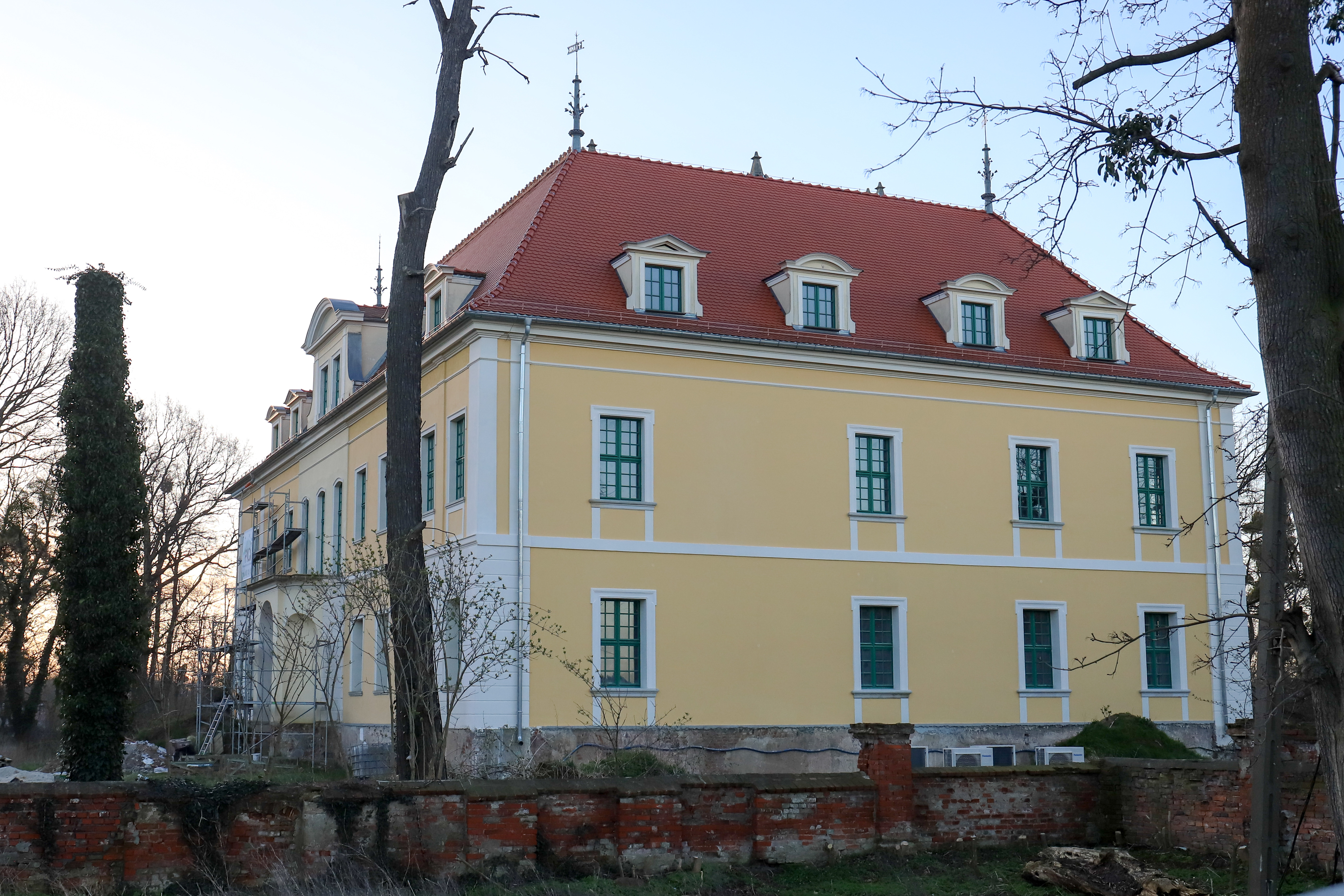
Osseg Palace

=== Coat of Arms ===
In 1644 the white line and the black line united their arms, a griffin claw and unicorn respectively, resulting in a quartered shield. According to family tradition, the three banners in the coat of arms stem from an ancestor, the knight Iwan, who was awarded them by Rudolf I of Germany for having taken them from the enemy in battle against Ottokar II of Bohemia.

== Members ==
- Thomas von dem Knesebeck (the Elder), Privy Councillor and Landeshauptmann (Governor) of the Altmark (1559–1625)
- Thomas von dem Knesebeck (the Younger), Privy Councillor and Landeshauptmann (Governor) of the Altmark (1594–1658)
- Hempo von dem Knesebeck, diplomat and Master of the Horse to Christian I. of Anhalt (1595–1656)
- Levin von dem Knesebeck, Prussian author and poet (1597–1638)
- Karl Ludwig von dem Knesebeck, Royal Prussian Chamberlain (1694–1760)
- Karl Friedrich von dem Knesebeck, Prussian Field Marshal, credited with planning the Battle of the Nations (1768–1848)
- Friedrich August Wilhelm von dem Knesebeck, Hanoverian Major-General (1775–1842)
- Julius Friedrich von dem Knesebeck, principal equerry to Prince Adolphus, Duke of Cambridge (1801-1859)
- August von dem Knesebeck, German Major-General (1804–1886)
- Ernst Julius Georg von dem Knesebeck, Hanoverian Lieutenant-General, last Hanoverian ambassador to Vienna (1809–1869)
- Alfred von dem Knesebeck, Major in the Gardes du Corps, Member of the Reichstag (1816–1883)
- Bernhard Friedrich August von dem Knesebeck, German Major-General (1817–1887)
- Theodor Otto Erich Paridam von dem Knesebeck, German Major-General (1832–1910)
- Alexander August Julius von dem Knesebeck, German Lieutenant-General (1836–1920)
- Lothar Eugen Wilhelm von dem Knesebeck, German Lieutenant-General (1837–1928)
- Wilhelm Erich Cuno von dem Knesebeck, German Lieutenant-General (1841–1915)
- Lionel von dem Knesebeck, Hofmarschall to Prince Frederick Charles of Hesse, last King of Finland (1849–1916)
- Bodo von dem Knesebeck, Imperial Chamberlain and Master of Ceremonies, Secretary of the Order of the Black Eagle, co-founder and first President of the German Red Cross (1851–1911)
- Gerlach Hermann August von dem Knesebeck, German Major-General (1854–1917)
- Bernd von dem Knesebeck, German naval Commander, commanded the V Torpedo Boat Flotilla at the Battle of Dogger Bank; killed when his flagship SMS G 12 was sunk on 8 September 1915 (1876–1915).
- Georg von dem Knesebeck, German Lieutenant-General (1881–1955)
- Wasmod von dem Knesebeck, World War II German Colonel, recipient of the Knight's Cross of the Iron Cross (1910–1945)
- Klaus von dem Knesebeck, World War II German Colonel, recipient of the German Cross in Gold
- Krafft von dem Knesebeck, World War II German Captain, recipient of the German Cross in Gold (1916–1942)
