= Hempo von dem Knesebeck =

Hempo von dem Knesebeck (14 April 1595 – 19 June 1656) was a diplomat and Master of the Horse to Christian I. of Anhalt. He was later Privy Councillor and Landeshauptmann (governor) of the Altmark.

== Life ==
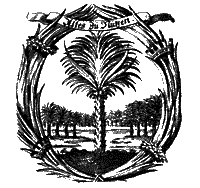
The Fruitbearing Society

He was born into one of the most prominent Brandenburg families as the son of Thomas von dem Knesebeck (the Elder) and brother of Thomas von dem Knesebeck (the Younger), who were instrumental in introducing Protestantism and Calvinism to Brandenburg. Both had also held the rank of Privy Councillor and Landeshauptmann of the Altmark.

Following private tutoring at home, Knesebeck studied at the universities of Helmstedt, Frankfurt (Oder), Wittenberg, Marburg, and Heidelberg from 1607 to 1616. He then embarked on the traditional Grand Tour for two years, visiting Geneva, Italy, France, England, and the Netherlands.

In 1618 he was appointed Valet de chambre and later Master of the Horse to Christian I. of Anhalt. He remained loyal to his master following the defeat at the Battle of White Mountain, the first major battle of the Thirty Years' War. He was appointed Privy Councillor and began a series of diplomatic missions, including Hungary, Livonia, Sweden, and Denmark. As a tutor, he also accompanied his student Prince Ernest to the Siege of Bergen op Zoom and later to Venice.

From 1624 to 1626, Knesebeck served a short period at the court of Louis I, Prince of Anhalt-Köthen. There, the prince admitted him into the prestigious Fruitbearing Society as the 88th member, giving him the title “The Good” (Der Gute).

At the Anhalt court, Knesebeck married Anna Lucretia von Erlach on December 6, 1624. After his father’s death in 1625, he returned to manage the family estate at Tylsen until he was appointed war commissary of the Altmark in 1626 to address the growing conflict. In 1646 he was made Landeshauptmann of the Altmark. A few years later he was elected director of the Altmark Knighthood.

His wife died on November 22, 1630. After a somewhat short year of mourning, Knesebeck married his second wife, Anna von Jagow, on August 17, 1631. He had two sons with her, Achaz and Thomas, both of whom would also go on to serve as governors of the Altmark.
