= Thomas von dem Knesebeck =

Thomas von dem Knesebeck may refer to:

- Thomas von dem Knesebeck (the Younger) (1594–1658), Privy Councillor and Landeshauptmann (Governor) of the Altmark
- Thomas von dem Knesebeck (the Elder) (1559–1625), Privy Councillor and Landeshauptmann (Governor) of the Altmark
