= Bodo von dem Knesebeck =

Bodo Hugo Bernhard von dem Knesebeck (9 April 1851 – 6 August 1911) was Vice-Master of the Ceremonies under Kaiser Wilhelm II and from 1897 the first chairman of the Central Committee of the German Red Cross Associations, predecessor of the German Red Cross, and deputy chairman of the German Central Committee for Combating Tuberculosis (DZK).

== Early life ==
Bodo von dem Knesebeck was born in 1851 to Agnes von Linsingen and the Hanoverian diplomat and general Ernst Julius Georg von dem Knesebeck. His older brother Lionel would later go on to be Hofmarschall to Prince Frederick Charles of Hesse, last King of Finland.

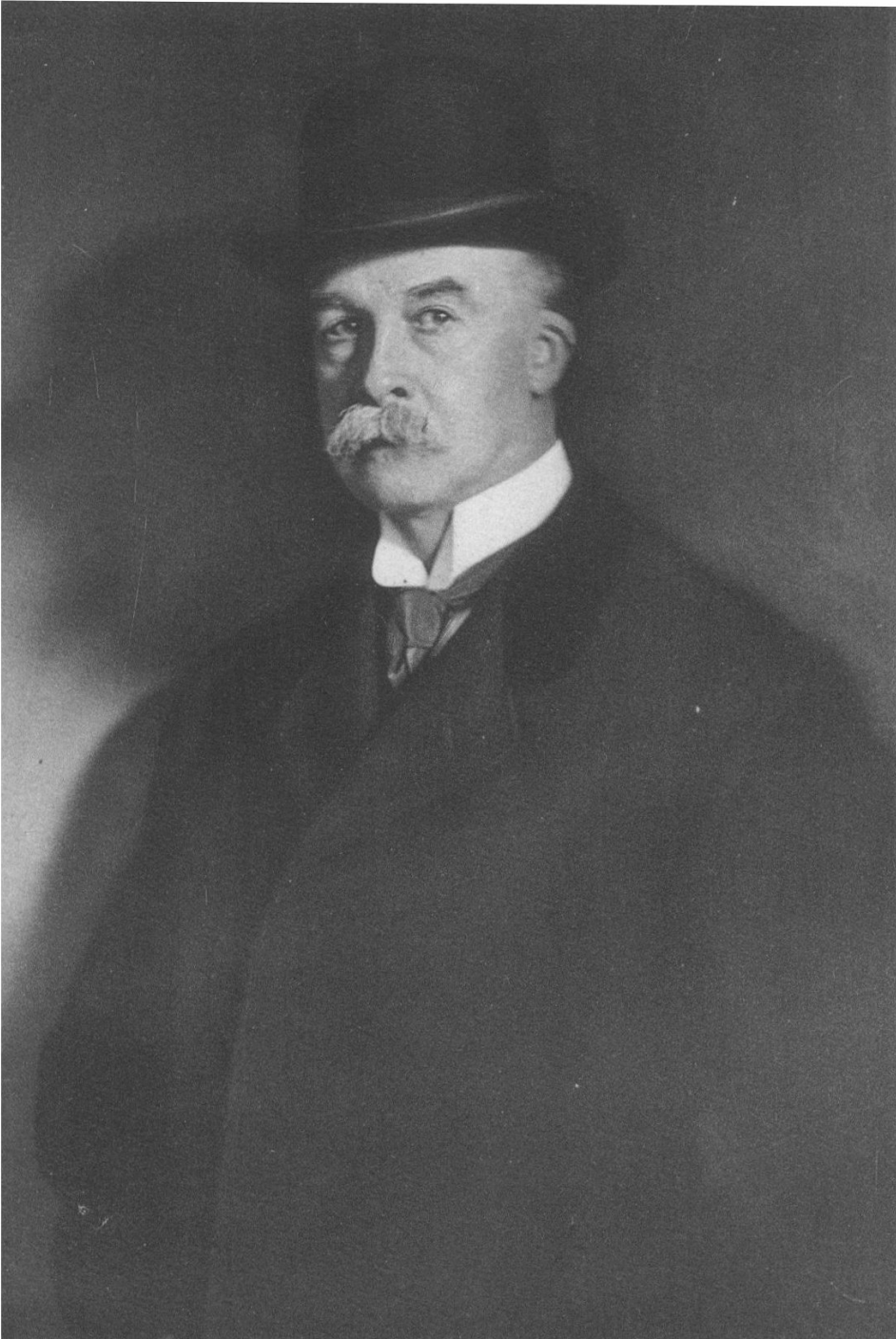
Bodo von dem Knesebeck

He initially served as an officer in the Life-Guard-Hussars Regiment, an elite unit of Guards Hussars for the Prussian king. Bodo later fought with the Hussar Regiment King Wilhelm I (1st Rhenish) No. 7 during the Franco-Prussian War, reaching the rank of Oberleutnant. He secured the appointment of his comrade, the later Imperial Chancellor Bernhard von Bülow to the unit and served as his squadron leader. During the Battle of Hallue, Knesebeck had his horse shot from under him. He also fought at the Battle of Bapaume.

Bodo remained in the reserves thereafter, becoming a Major. He remained a lifelong friend and ally at court of von Bülow, and was highly critical of the circumstances of the latter's removal from office.

== Court career ==
From 1887 to 1890 he was chamberlain and cabinet secretary to Empress Augusta, wife of Kaiser Wilhelm I. From 1890 he held the same role for Empress Augusta Viktoria, wife of Kaiser Wilhelm II. At the same time, he served as the imperial vice-master of ceremonies and introducer of the diplomatic corps, as well as Secretary of the Order of the Black Eagle, Prussia and Imperial Germany's highest award.

He was considered an educated and charming representation of the older class of German gentry, maintaining close contacts with the artistic and philosophical circles in Berlin. He was a co-initiator of the Goethe Society and a “chevalresque admirer” of Marie von Schleinitz and her literary salons, where Prine Philipp of Eulenburg performed his own songs. Knesebeck was in close and regular contact with Cosima Wagner, daughter of Franz Liszt and wife of Richard Wagner.

While a close friend of the empress, Knesbeck was far more sceptical of the Kaiser. On 29 October 1894, he commented on the dismissal of Caprivi and appointment of Chlodwig, Prince of Hohenlohe-Schillingsfürst as chancellor in a letter to the latter's son, the politician Alexander zu Hohenlohe-Schillingsfürst:

"The Emperor does not know the extent of the current situation because he does not yet understand the extent of his own fault in it. Only this knowledge will make the situation tolerable for the Prince [Hohenlohe]... The time in which the Prince is at the head of affairs must become a school for the Emperor, otherwise the situation will remain untenable. For if all other factors change, the Emperor will remain, and the unpredictability of this permanent factor must be removed. I would still like to assume that there is time and, given the presence of such great talent, the possibility for this. But here lies the core of the evil."

During the Eulenburg affair, Knesebeck was highly concerned about the time spent by the Kaiser in the company of Eulenburg, who was a “very dangerous friend for the Sovereign”, calling him “false, ambitious and incapable of grasping the broad principles of policy”.

In 1909, he overheard the Kaiser discussing with a boat pilot in Bari his foreign and domestic policies, as well as his personal relations with other sovereigns and his ministers. Thereafter, Knesebeck would privately comment to Bülow “the pilot of Bari”, when the Kaiser was indiscrete in front of foreign dignitaries.

Bülow later said of him: “His death, which occurred not long before the outbreak of the World War, was a great loss to the Empress, and she felt it deeply. It was also a loss to William II, although His Majesty did not at bottom like Knesebeck, probably feeling that the latter, with his quiet scepticism, did not take him quite au serieux. Knesebeck, however, was so suave that there was no getting at him.”

=== Red Cross ===
Empress Augusta was long and enthusiastically involved in a variety of charitable and medical works, and included Knesebeck in her efforts to improve and formalise them. From January 1897, Knesebeck became the first chairman of the Central Committee of the German Red Cross Associations and chairman of the Red Cross People's Health Center Association.

On December 19, 1895, under the honorary chairmanship of Marie zu Hohenlohe-Schillingsfürst, the Red Cross People's Health Center Association had been founded as a special organization outside of the existing Red Cross association structures in the Reich Chancellor's Palace in Berlin. The aim of the organisation, which became the Central Committee for Combating Tuberculosis (DZK), was to systematically address tuberculosis in exemplary facilities under the direct influence of its central offices.

Knesebeck took an active role in the advancement of medical care both nationally and globally. He offered support to the Japanese in the Russo-Japanese War and strongly advocated for greater involvement by the Red Cross in conflict situations and preparation for epidemics. Knesebeck was highly regarded internationally for his work in this area. He authored an extensive analysis of the German approach to the fight against tuberculosis for the International Congress on Tuberculosis in Washington D.C. on 21 September to 12 October 1908.

In recognition of his services, he was awarded an honorary Doctorate of medicine by the Friedrich Wilhelm University in Berlin. He was made Knight Commander of the Royal Victorian Order, on the occasion of the visit of the German emperor to the Queen on November 23, 1899, and raised to Knight Grand Cross in 1907 by Edward VII. He also received the Order of the Black Eagle.

He died unexpectedly on 8 August 1911 in Kassel after a minor operation. Guests at his funeral included the royal family, as well as representatives of the charitable foundations he had supported. In his Red Cross duties he was succeeded by Curt von Pfuel, who oversaw the German Red Cross's activities during the First World War. A memorial designed by Ludwig Manzel was unveiled in his honour at the Hohenlychen Sanatorium in 1913.

== Sources ==
- Bülow, Bernhard von (1932): Memoirs of Prince von Bülow Vol. 1: From Secretary of State to Imperial Chancellor, 1897–1903. Putnam.
- Bülow, Bernhard von (1932): Memoirs of Prince von Bülow Vol. 2: From the Morocco Crisis to Resignation, 1903–1909. Putnam.
- Bülow, Bernhard von (1932): Memoirs of Prince von Bülow Vol. 3: The World War and Germany's Collapse, 1909–1919. Putnam.
- Fesser, Gerd (1991): Reichskanzler Bernhard Fürst von Bülow: eine Biographie. Berlin: Deutscher Verlag der Wissenschaften GmbH.
- Hampe, Hermann and Dauzat, Rick (2019): Legacies in Steel. Casemate Philadelphia & Oxford.
- International Bulletin of Red Cross Societies (1911), Volume 42, Issue 168, October 1911, pp. 180 – 195.
- Käser, Frank (2014): Adolf Henle (1864–1936) und die deutsche Rot-Kreuz-Expedition 1905 in Japan, in OAG Notizen 10/2014, pp. 23–39.
- Knesebeck, Bodo von dem (1908): German Red Cross and the Fight Against Tuberculosis; Denkschrift für den Internationalelen Tuberkulose-Kongress. Das Rote Kreuz.
- Petersdorff, Herman von (1902): "Augusta" in: Allgemeine Deutsche Biographie 46 (1902), pp. 89–143
- Philippi, Hans (1990): Der Hof Kaiser Wilhelms II. in Karl Möckl (ed.): Hof und Hofgesellschaft in den deutschen Staaten im 19. und beginnenden 20. Jahrhundert. Oldenbourg Wissenschaftsverlag.
- Röhl, John C. G. (2014). Wilhelm II: Into the Abyss of War and Exile 1900–1941. Cambridge University Press.
- Röhl, John C. G. (1985): Hof und Hofgesellschaft unter Kaiser Wilhelm II, in: Pariser Historische Studien, Bd. 21, 1985.
