= Karl Friedrich von dem Knesebeck =

Prussian soldier (1768–1848)

Field Marshal Freiherr Karl Friedrich von dem Knesebeck
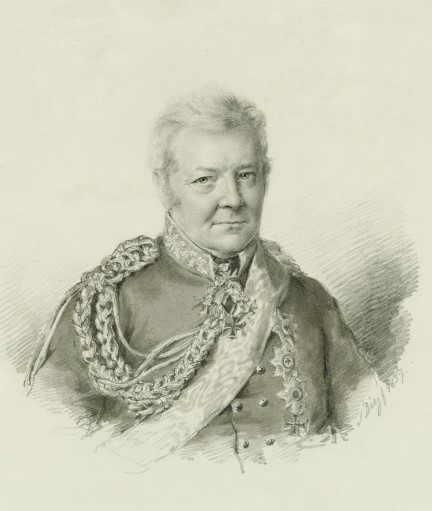
- Field Marshal von dem Knesebeck

Personal details
- Born: 5 May 1768 Karwe (Carwe) near Neuruppin, Prussia
- Died: 12 January 1848 (aged 79) Berlin, Prussia
Awards
Pour le Mérite with Oak Leaves
Order of the Black Eagle
Order of St. Andrew
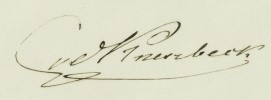
- Signature

Military service
- Allegiance: (Kingdom of Prussia) Prussia
- Branch/service: Army
- Years of service: 1782–1848
- Rank: Field Marshal
- Unit: Regiment von Kalkstein; Regiment Duke of Brunswick; Prussian General Staff; Feldjäger-Korps
- Commands: Mounted Feldjäger Corps; Army of Occupation, Posen
- Battles/wars: French Revolutionary Wars; Battle of Valmy; Battle of Pirmasens; First Battle of Kaiserslautern; Second Battle of Kaiserslautern; Napoleonic Wars; Battle of Auerstedt; Battle of Pułtusk; Battle of Aspern-Essling; Battle of Bautzen; Battle of Lützen; Battle of Dresden; Battle of Kulm; Battle of Leipzig; Battle of Brienne; Battle of Paris; Revolutions of 1830; Greater Poland uprising (1846); Greater Poland Uprising (1848)

Karl Friedrich von dem Knesebeck (5 May 1768– 12 January 1848) was a Prussian field marshal and military adviser in the Napoleonic Wars, best known for designing the campaign plan of the Battle of the Nations and the subsequent invasion of France. As aide-de-camp to the king from 1813, and thereby his closest military advisor, he was a key figure in Prussia's military policy throughout the War of the Sixth Coalition and the subsequent Congress of Vienna.

== Early life ==
Knesebeck was born on the family estate Karwe, close to Neuruppin in the Margraviate of Brandenburg, as the son of an officer who had served in the Royal Guard of Frederick the Great and been severely wounded the Battle of Kolín. Knesebeck entered military service in 1783 aged 14, when he was commissioned into the Regiment of General von Kalckstein in Magdeburg. That year, Knesebeck was present during a review of the regiment by Frederick the Great. While passing along the regiment and enquiring after the identity of the junior officers, the king reached Knesebeck:

Now it was my turn. "What is his name?" - "Knesebeck, Your Majesty." - "What was his father?" - "Lieutenant in Your Majesty's Guard." - The King: "Ah, that Knesebeck!" and with a completely different, sympathetic voice, asking me two questions in a row, he continued: "How is his father? Are his injuries still hurting him?" My father had been seriously wounded at Kolin and had been shot right through his body and arm. "Give my regards to your father!" And as he was about to turn around, looking around once more and raising the index finger of his right hand, from which the stick dangled, and looking at me once more, he said in a gracious voice: "And do not forget it!"

As he showed a keen interest in poetry, Knesebeck soon made friends with the later famous authors and poets Friedrich de la Motte Fouqué and Heinrich von Kleist, who served with him during his early career. In 1787 he was posted to the Regiment of the Duke of Brunswick.

An extended period in Halberstadt enabled him to join the vibrant local literary society and greatly increase his classical education, which in keeping with the times had previously been limited to some private tutoring. During this time he was mentored by Johann Wilhelm Ludwig Gleim, with whom he maintained a lifelong correspondence. As a young lieutenant and writer, he became friends with Johann Wolfgang von Goethe. In 1790 Knesebeck was posted to Silesia with his regiment. During this time he wrote one of his best known poems, Lob des Krieges (In Praise of War), which by 1805 had been set to music and became wildly popular as a patriotic song.

== Wars against France ==
In the War of the First Coalition, Knesebeck participated in the disastrous and personally disappointing Battle of Valmy and the subsequent victories at Primasens, as well as the First and Second Battles of Kaiserslautern. Frustrated by the contemporary discourse on the war, Knesebeck published a book under the pseudonym of a Swiss observer, examining the campaign in detail and errors in its public perception. Based on his experiences during the conflict he advocated for defense in depth, with strong logistics and supply lines, and combined with well-established fortresses. By 1794 Knesebeck's abilities had been noticed by the Duke of Brunswick, the commander of the Coalition's combined forces, and he was ordered to his staff, where he was promoted several times (1797 Premierlieutenant, 1799 Captain, 1802 Major).

In 1803, as adjutant to General von Rüchel and motivated by him, Knesebeck wrote a memorandum to the Duke of Brunswick calling for the radical step of truly universal conscription and the formation of a national Landwehr (militia), which he called "the Legion of Honour" of the Prussian state. Though the proposals were accepted by the king, they were rejected outright by the Emergency Commission for Military Organization, which later adopted a limited version of the proposal. This was the most significant reform proposal made prior to the later and more substantial reorganisation of the Prussian Army by Gerhard von Scharnhorst in 1806, and formed part of those plans.

In December 1803, Knesebeck was promoted to Quartermaster in the General Staff. With a mission for William I, Elector of Hesse, he began a series of diplomatic services for Prussia. In this period he first became associated with the later prominent generals Scharnhorst and Blücher, arranging for the former to be employed in Prussian services.

For most of the War of the Fourth Coalition in 1806, Knesebeck served with General Rüchel's staff. Seconded to Frederick William III of Prussia's staff, it was reportedly due to Knesebeck's quick thinking that the king evaded capture during the double Battle of Jena–Auerstedt, as well as during his subsequent flight. He retained the king's favour for the rest of his career. During the retreat, Knesebeck was alone among officers on the staff to strongly advocate for a bold advance westward to combine with the forces of Blücher, Lecoq and the Duke of Weimar, in order to provide resistance there and buy time for new Prussian forces to be established in concert with Russia. Though the plan was initially received with enthusiasm by the general staff, the strong opposition of General Massenbach won the day and the retreat continued towards Magdeburg.

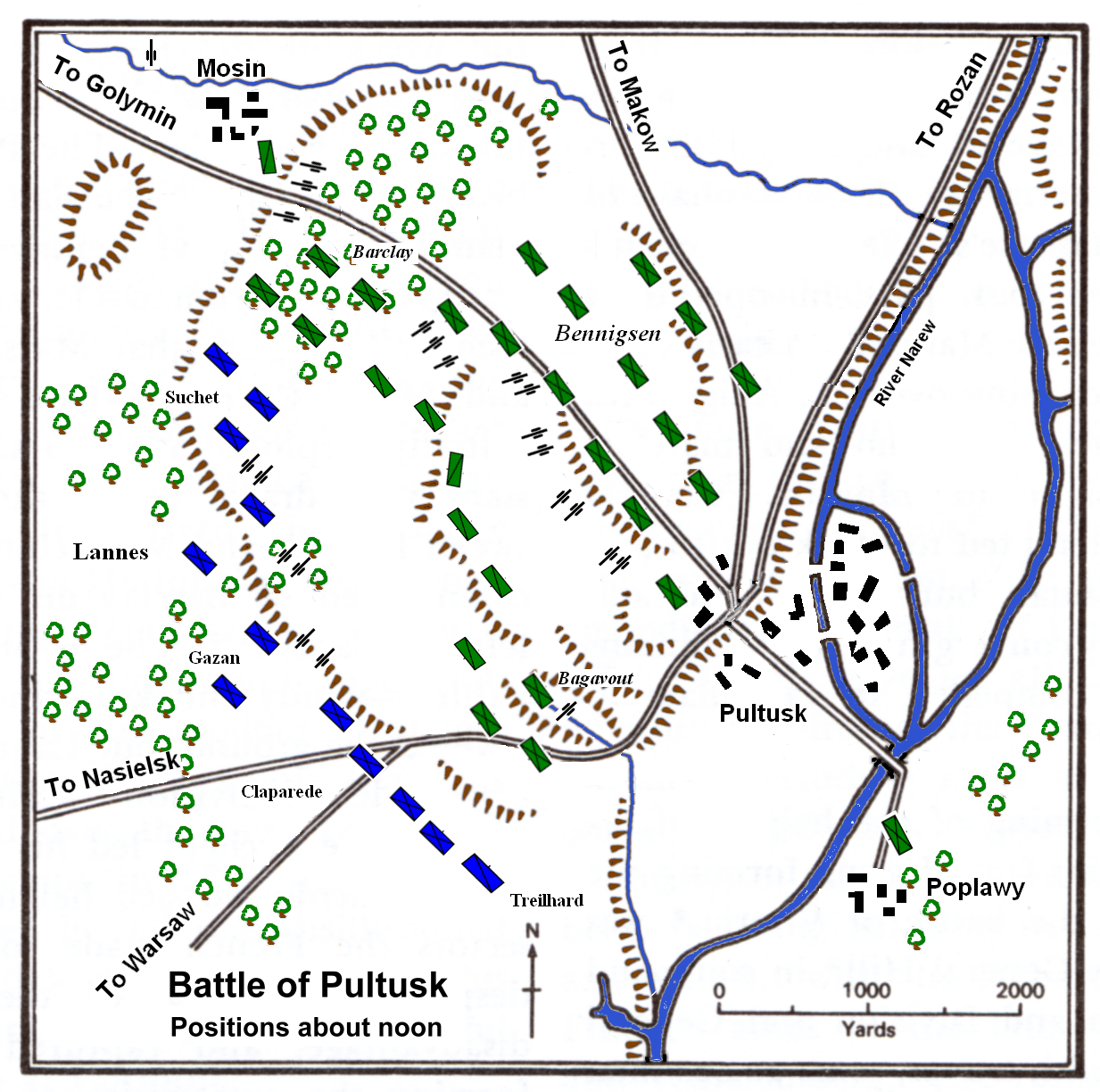
Battle of Pułtusk, 1806

Knesebeck subsequently served variously on the Prussian and Russian staff, being seconded to the Russian headquarters of General Bennigsen and showing strategic abilities with the planning of the victorious Battle of Pułtusk on 26 December 1806. The Russian army having succeeded in holding its ground, he begged Bennigsen to pursue the enemy, who instead decided to retreat. Knesebeck openly expressed his frustration about Bennigsen, writing "God preserve us from his victories, three more and we will be before St Petersburg". For his services at the battle, the King awarded him the Pour le Mérite and promoted him to Lieutenant-Colonel on 16 May 1807. A mission to Vienna to encourage action on the part of the Austrian forces to the French rear ended abruptly with the Treaties of Tilsit.

Along with many other officers who refused to serve under French command, Knesebeck sought his discharge from military service and returned to his estates in Neuruppin and Tylsen. In 1810 he was offered the role of military governor to the crown prince, but declined. During the War of the Fifth Coalition, in which Prussia did not participate, he received a secret order to observe enemy action in Austria and to report any opportunity for Prussia to enter the conflict. As such he attended the Battle of Aspern-Essling, which he viewed as a wasted victory. Though believing a Prussian intervention to be opportune, an accident prevented him from presenting his report to the king in person. His friend Heinrich von Kleist, now a civilian, had left a loaded pistol on the table in an inn near Aspern, which was fired by Knesebeck's adjutant in jest, hitting Knesebeck in the shoulder. The slowed correspondence with the king via messengers over the next weeks meant that by the time Knesebeck was ordered to offer the Austrians full support, the war was essentially lost.

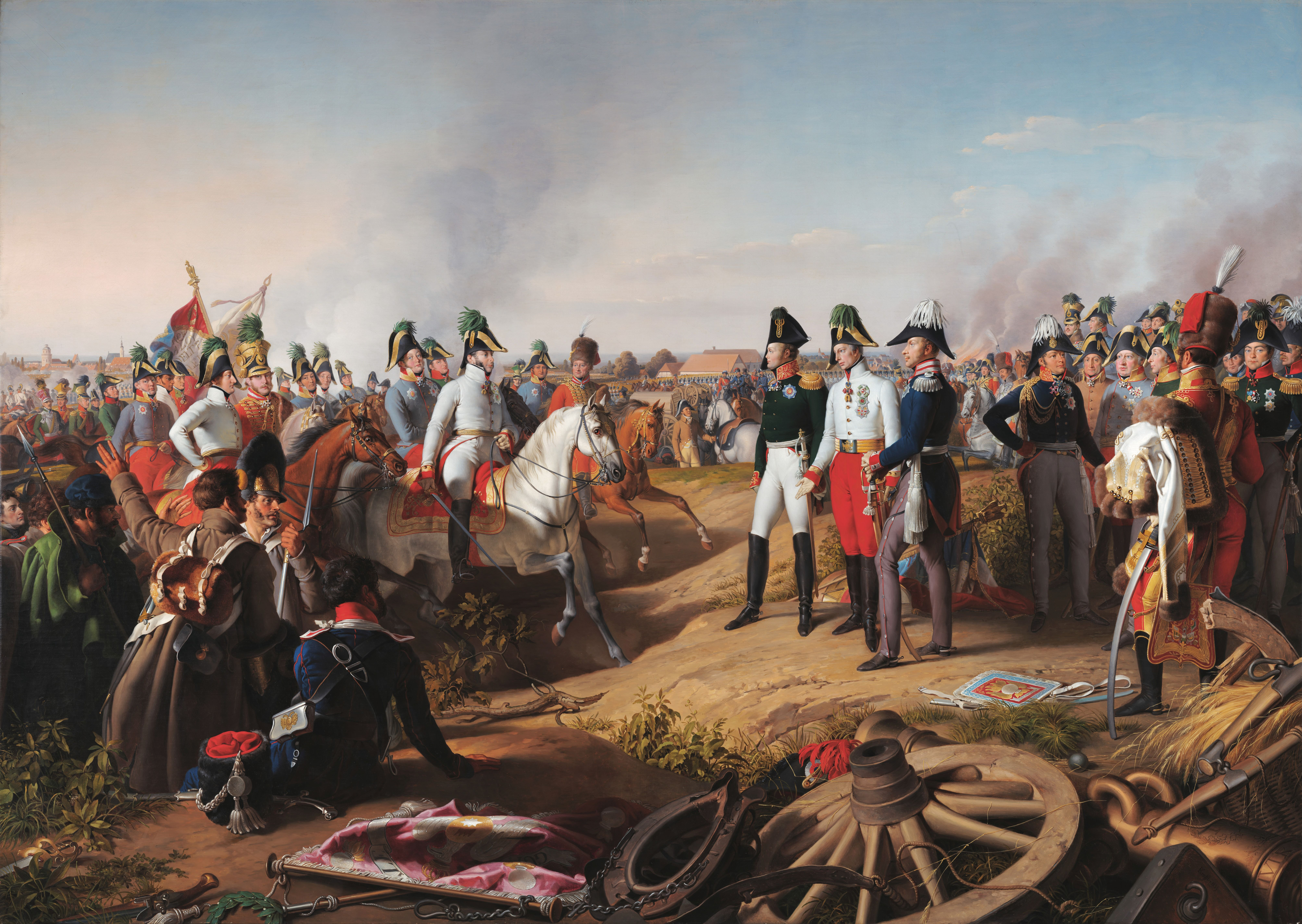
The Declaration of Victory After the Battle of Leipzig by Johann Peter Krafft. Aftermath of the Battle of Leipzig. Knesebeck is depicted immediately to the right of the victorious monarchs.

In 1812 Knesebeck received a new diplomatic task, the success of which later created the basis of the allies’ later victories against Napoleon in 1813. He received the official mission from the Prime Minister of Prussia, Hardenberg, to inform Tsar Alexander I of Russia that Napoleon would deem it necessary to invade Russia, should the tsar not lay down his arms. At the same time he was secretly ordered by the King to persuade the Russian Emperor to lure Napoleon into the wide extremities of his country and not to make peace until Napoleon's Grande Armée had worn itself down. According to Knesebeck's own writings, the tsar answered that he would not "make peace, even if I would have to retreat to Kazan". Knesebeck has been given credit for developing this strategy, though he himself had advocated that it should only be attempted if Austria could be induced to harass the French flank and rear. On hearing of the part that Knesebeck had played in this strategy, following the disastrous French invasion of Russia, Napoleon reportedly told his ambassador to Prussia Antoine de Saint-Marsan, "we must keep an eye on him" ("Il ne faut pas le perdre de vue").

On 6 March 1813 Knesebeck was promoted to colonel and aide-de-camp to the king, becoming his closest military advisor. He was Prussia's main negotiator at the Treaty of Kalisch, which made its entry in the war on the side of Russia official and established Prussia's post war borders. This agreement was broadly adhered to at the later Congress of Vienna. He was subsequently sent to Vienna to prepare Austria's participation in the War of the Sixth Coalition. In the same year he was promoted to major-general. He spent most of the conflict in the Coalition headquarters, participating in the costly battles of Lützen and the Bautzen, where he directed the army's orderly retreat. He was thereafter a driving force behind the Truce of Pläswitz, which allowed the Coalition time to consolidate its forces for the upcoming campaign.

Together with the Russian General Toll and the Austrian General Radetzky he subsequently played a major part in designing the Coalition's new campaign plan, participating in the Battles of Dresden, Kulm, and the decisive Battle of the Nations, as well as the subsequent invasion of France. His influence during this period was significant, and he is generally considered the leading Prussian voice in the Coalition's military strategy. Even when he was briefly ill, the monarchs are said to have gathered at his bedside to continue discussing maneuvers. Following the Battle of the Nations, the Swedish Crown Prince Jean Bernadotte, formerly a French Marshal of the Empire, reportedly gave Knesebeck public credit for the victory.

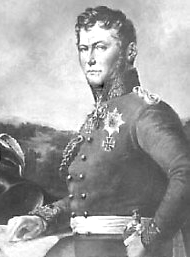
Knesebeck in 1814

For these services he was promoted to lieutenant-general and awarded the Oak Leaves to his Pour le Mérite, along with the Grand Cross of the Russian Order of Saint Vladimir, the Grand Cross of the Austrian Order of Leopold, and the Grand Cross of the Swedish Order of the Sword. For Kulm he was also among the first recipients of the newly created Iron Cross, established just five months earlier. In his more conservative attitude and insistence on maintaining strong supply lines and securing strategic ground, he frequently clashed with more aggressive commanders such as Blücher, Scharnhorst and Gneisenau. Nevertheless, aware of his influence, they were at pains to maintain good relations with him, with Gneisenau in particular corresponding regularly with Knesebeck. Knesebeck likewise recognised the importance of close coordination with commanders in the field.

In 1815 Knesebeck married Adolphine Susanne Luise Karoline Johanna von Klitzing, with whom he had a twin son and daughter. His son, Alfred von dem Knesebeck, later played a major role in improving battlefield surgery during the Second Schleswig War, and the Austro-Prussian and Franco-Prussian Wars.

Knesebeck was again called to diplomatic services in 1815 to negotiate with Vienna to the effect of an Austrian participation in the Seventh Coalition. His proposal for the Waterloo campaign, of a Prussian and British army working in close coordination, supported by a Russian army and further forces on other fronts was widely accepted by the commanders on the ground, including Wellington.

Later he accompanied the king to London and took part in the Congress of Vienna as Prussia's principle military delegate. At the Congress Knesebeck took a firm line against Russian expansionism into Western Europe, stating that to believe its protestations of merely defensive acquisitions, one would have to "hide the map, blindfold one's eyes, and see only Alexander's heart, in that case, the sole guarantee of the other states' security". His memoranda to this effect were passed on by Castlereagh to the British Prime Minister Liverpool, and encouraged their own position on Poland.

== Post-War ==
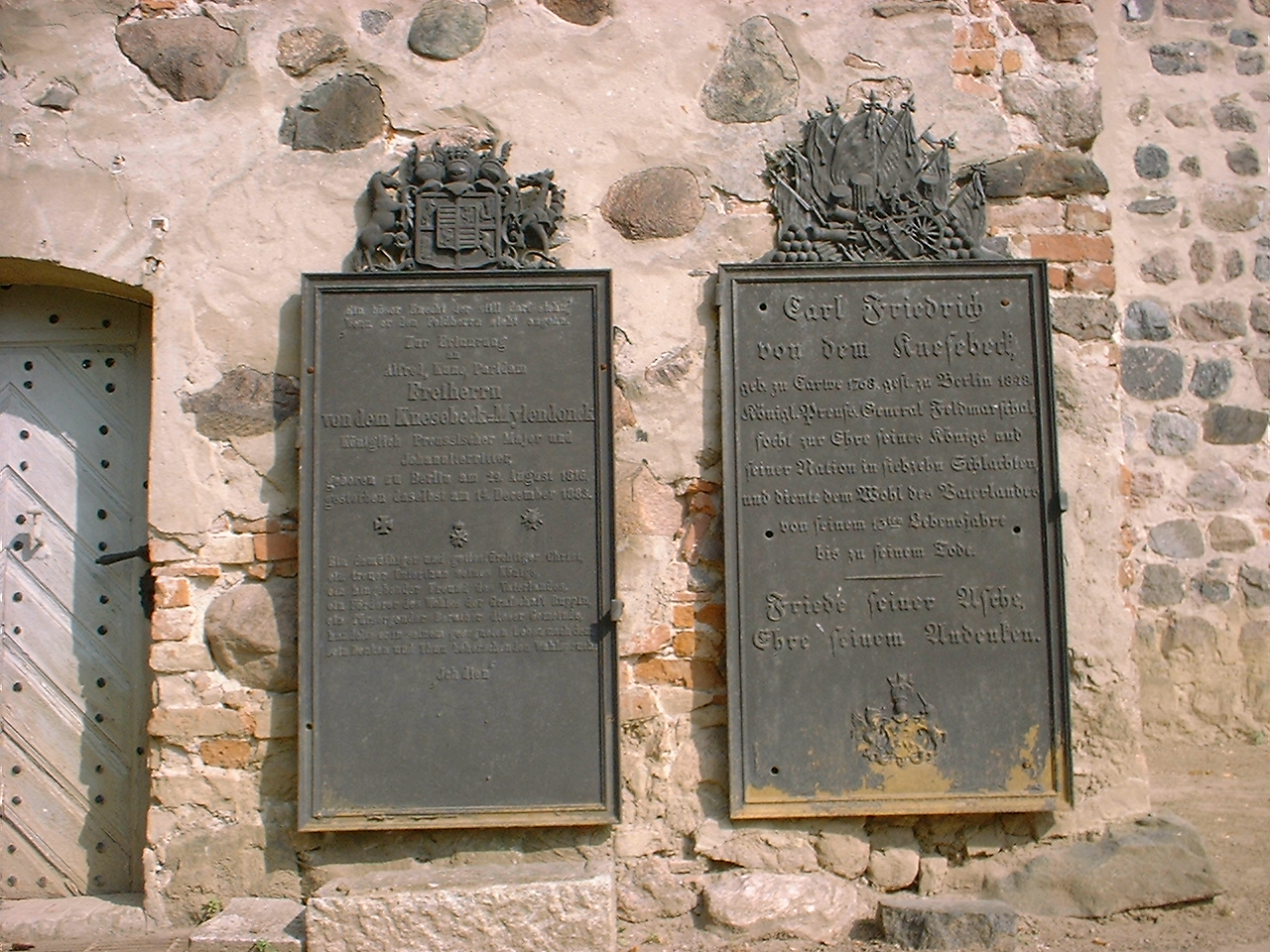
Memorial on the wall of the Church in Neuruppin-Karwe

In 1819 Knesebeck accompanied the Crown Prince, later King Frederick William IV, on a tour of Switzerland and Bavaria. The two men had come to know each other during the earlier military campaigns and became close lifelong friends. A journey to Rome in the same year resulted in his inadvertent purchase of the Head of Christ by Corregio, which he had initially considered a copy but which turned out to be the stolen original. He eventually gifted the painting to the Prussian royal family, on the condition that it would remain in the Royal Chapel.

In 1822 Knesebeck became commander of the mounted Feldjäger Corps, while remaining aide-de-camp to the king. In 1823 King Frederick William III gave him the estate Huysburg, in recognition of his services. Knesebeck was promoted to full General in 1825 and was appointed commander-in-chief of the army in the Grand Duchy of Posen. He received the Order of the Black Eagle in 1832 and the Order of St. Andrew in 1834, the highest awards of Prussia and Russia respectively.

In 1840 it was Knesebeck who brought the news of King Frederick William III's death to the Viennese court. That same year he was offered elevation to Graf (Earl), but declined, preferring to retain his Freiherr title.

Armed tensions in Poland provided King Frederick William IV, for whom Knesebeck was still officially acting as primary military adviser, the opportunity to offer him promotion to field marshal on 7 October 1847, a five star rank that could only be bestowed in wartime. Knesebeck also declined this honour, pointing to his advanced age and suggesting it would "make a mockery of active field marshals". He instead requested his discharge from the army, which was granted him with a simultaneous promotion to field marshal at the insistence of the king. He died on 12 January 1848 in Berlin. Following a state funeral with an honour guard of nine regiments he was buried in the Alter Garnisonfriedhof.

On the church in Neuruppin-Karwe hangs a memorial to Knesebeck, with the inscription:

"Carl Friedrich von dem Knesebeck, born in Carwe 1768, died in Berlin 1848. A Prussian field marshal, he fought for the honour of his King and Country in 17 battles and served to the glory of his fatherland from his 13th year until his death. Peace to his remains, honour to his memory."

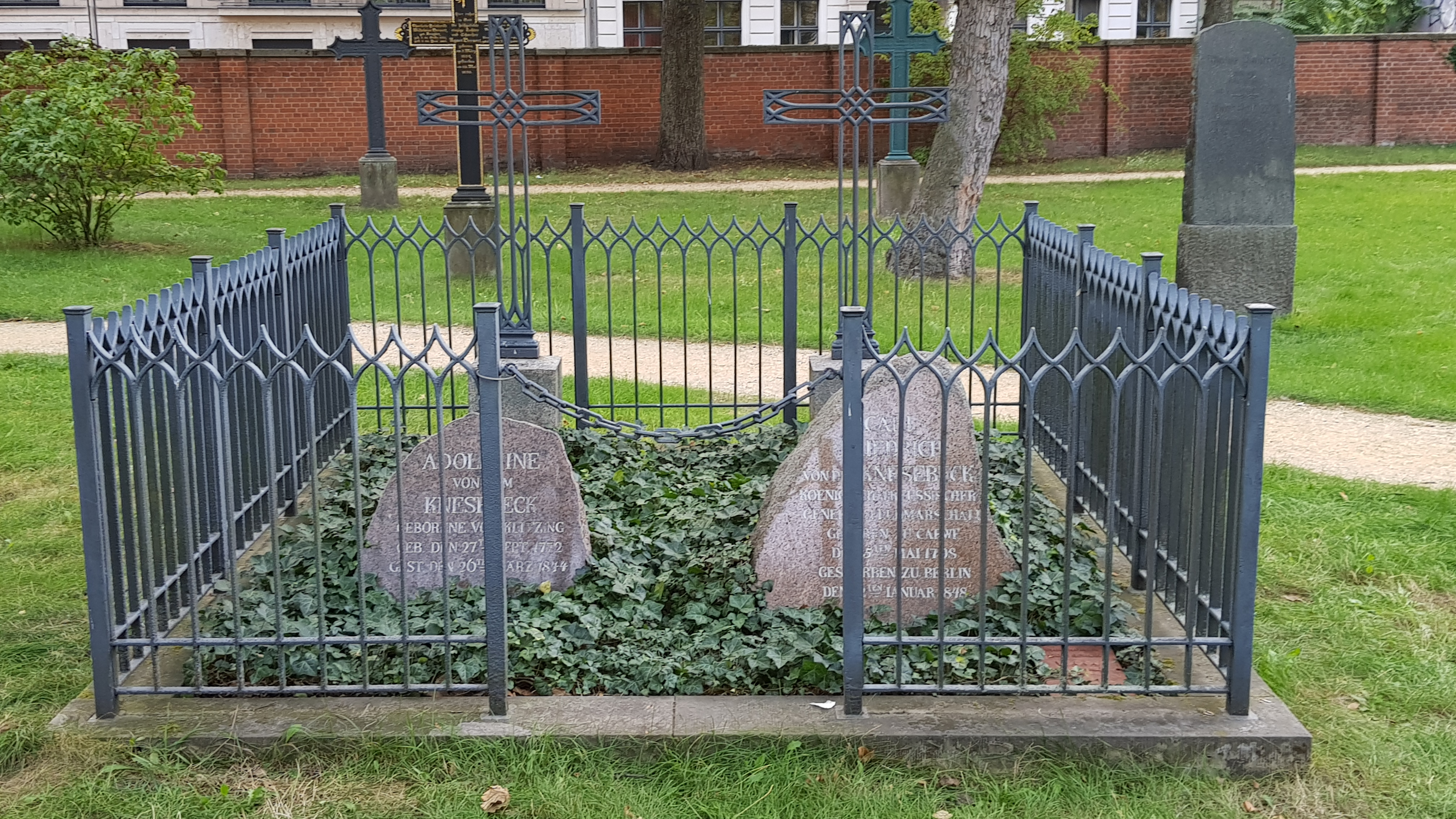
Grave in the Alter Garnisonsfriedhof

Between 1983 and 1986 the awards received by Knesebeck, held by the German Historical Museum in Berlin, were among the priceless collection stolen and sold on the black market by an employee of the museum. Together with the orders worn by several German kings, emperors, and generals, numerous other unique pieces were taken during the theft. Only a limited number of the items in question have since been recovered, making it one of the greatest scandals of the military antiques market.

== Works ==
- “Lob des Krieges” (“Praise of war,” 1805), a poem which enjoyed great popularity

== Honours ==
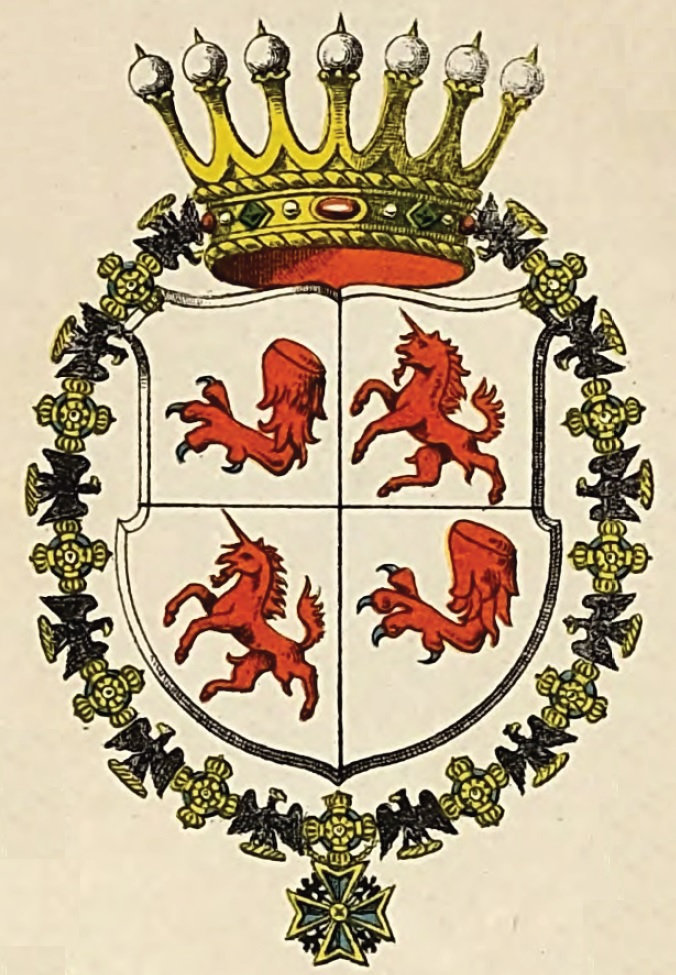
Personal Arms of Karl Friedrich von dem Knesebeck

- Prussia: Pour le Mérite with Oak Leaves
- Prussia: Order of the Black Eagle; collar ("chain") of the order in 1847
- Prussia: Order of the Red Eagle
- Prussia: Order of Hohenzollern
- Prussia: Iron Cross, 1st Class. One of the first awarded.
- Prussia: Service Award Cross
- Austrian Empire: Order of Leopold
- Bavaria: Military Order of Max Joseph
- Russian Empire: Order of St. Andrew
- Russian Empire: Order of St. Alexander Nevsky
- Russian Empire: Order of the White Eagle
- Russian Empire: Order of St. Vladimir
- Russian Empire: Order of St. Anna
- Russian Empire: Order of Saint Stanislaus
- Sweden: Order of the Sword
- Kingdom of France: French Order of Military Merit

== Notes ==
Titles of nobility
Preceded by Friedrich Wilhelm Leopold	Baron von dem Knesebeck (in Prussia) –	Succeeded by Alfred Cuno Paridam
