= Alfred von dem Knesebeck =

German politician and soldier (1816–1883)

Alfred Cuno Paridam von dem Knesebeck
- Baron von dem Knesebeck

Member of the Reichstag of the North German Confederation
- In office 1867–1867
- Monarch: William I

Member of the Prussian House of Representatives
- In office 1866–1868
- In office 1859–1862
- Monarch: William I

Personal details
- Born: 29 August 1816 Berlin, Prussia
- Died: 14 December 1883 (aged 67) Karwe (Carwe) near Neuruppin, Prussia

Military service
- Allegiance: (Kingdom of Prussia) Prussia; German Empire
- Branch/service: Army
- Years of service: 1834–1859
- Rank: Major
- Unit: Gardes du Corps; Landwehr
- Battles/wars: Second Schleswig War; Austro-Prussian War; Franco-Prussian War

Alfred Cuno Paridam Freiherr von dem Knesebeck-Milendonck (29 August 1816 – 14. December 1883) was a soldier, landowner and member of the Prussian House of Representatives and the Reichstag of the North German Confederation for Free Conservative Party.

== Life ==
Alfred von dem Knesebeck was born in Berlin on 29 August 1816 to Field Marshal Karl Friedrich von dem Knesebeck and Adolphine von Klitzing, making him a member of the House of Knesebeck. He attended the Gymnasium zum Grauen Kloster in Berlin before commissioning into the Gardes du Corps in 1834, during which he became closely acquainted with Bismarck and Prince Waldemar of Prussia, with whom he maintained a lifelong friendship.

In 1844 he resigned his regular commission in order to take over the management of the family estates, though he remained in the Landwehr until 1859, reaching the rank of Major. In 1858 he witnessed the French colonial campaign in Kabylie.

On 28 September 1843 Knesebeck married Franziska von Bojanowski, daughter of Lieutenant-General Alfred von Bojanowski, following a brief courtship. From 1859 to 1862 and 1866–68 he was a Member of the Prussian House of Representatives, and in 1867 a Member the Reichstag of the North German Confederation.

As a Knight of the Order of St John he became heavily involved in care for the wounded during the Second Schleswig War (1864), the Austro-Prussian War (1866) and the Franco-Prussian War (1871). For these services he received the Order of the Red Eagle, the Order of the Crown with St John device, and the Bavarian Order of Military Merit. At the personal request of Crown Prince Frederick William, he was also presented with the first Iron Cross to be awarded for services in the Order of St John.

In light of his services and those of his father he was granted the joining the barony of Milendonck to that of Knesebeck. The Milendonck family had married into the Knesebeck family in the early 18th century, but had since become extinct. This was granted by royal decree on 10 March 1870.

== Honours ==
- Prussia: Order of the Red Eagle, 3rd Class
- Prussia: Order of the Crown, 3rd Class with Order of St John device. The first such awarded.
- Prussia: Order of St. John, Knight of Justice
- Prussia: Iron Cross, 2nd Class
- Prussia: Service Award Cross
- Bavaria: Military Merit Order, 2nd Class

Titles of nobility
Preceded by Karl Friedrich	Baron von dem Knesebeck (in Prussia) –	Succeeded by Erich Karl
