= Dambeck =

- Municipality
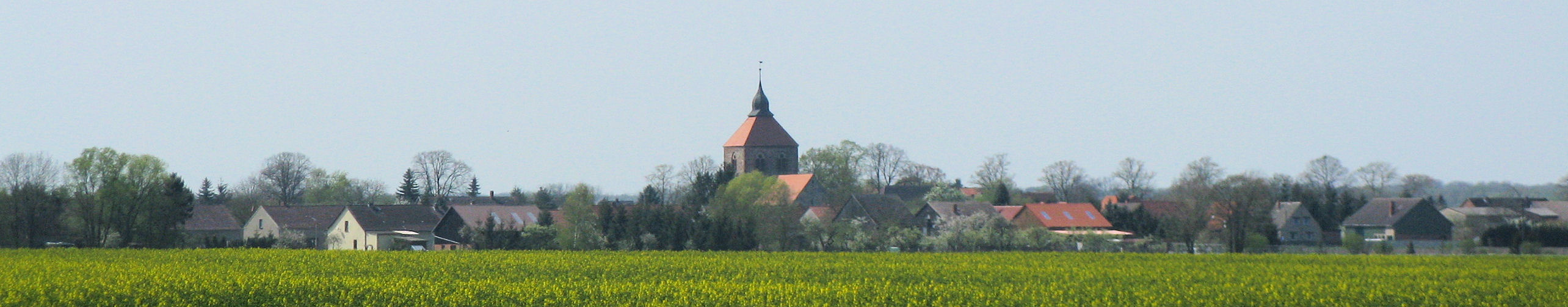
- Dambeck

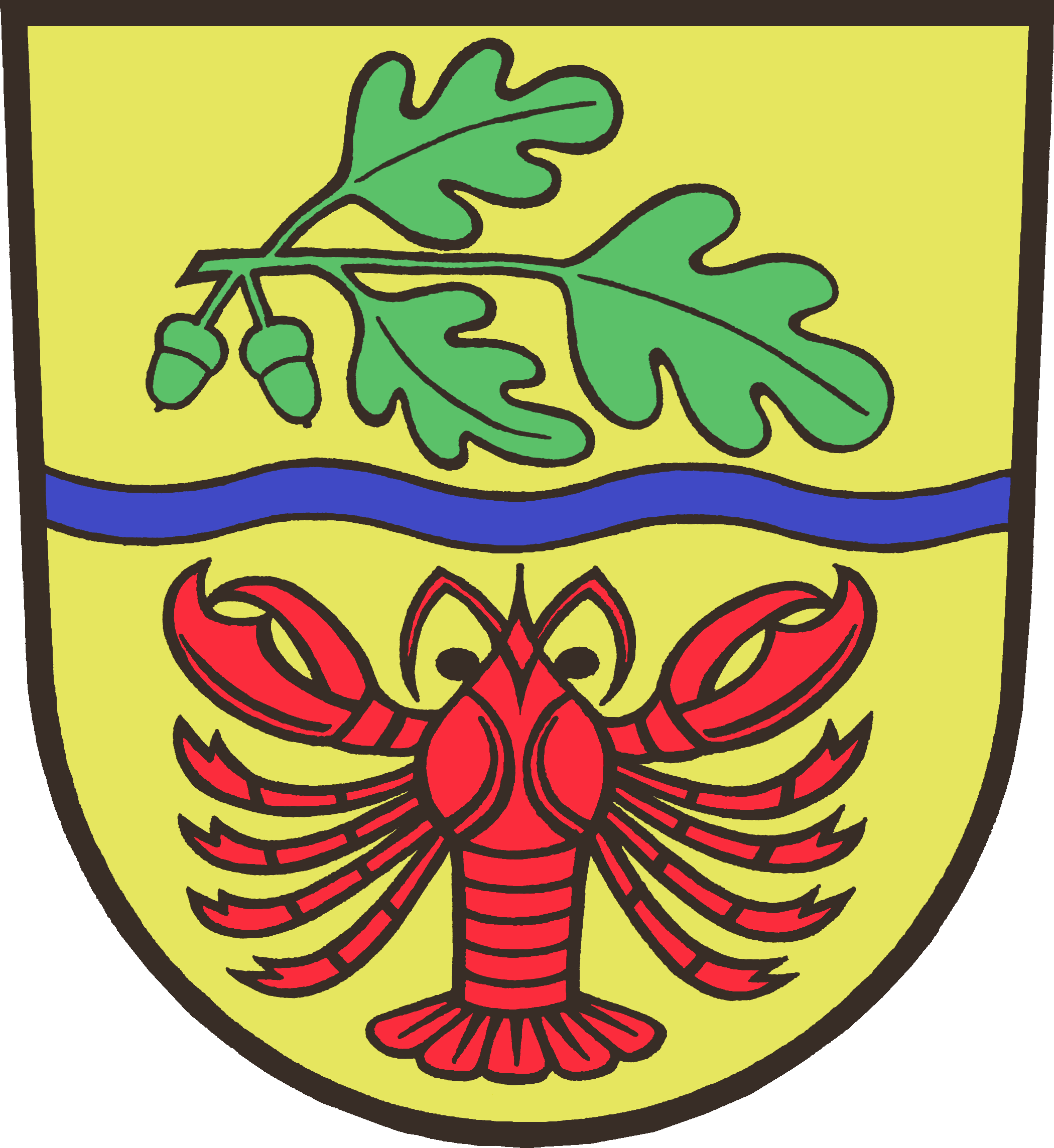
- Coat of arms

- Location of Dambeck within Ludwigslust-Parchim district
- Interactive map of Dambeck
- Location within Germany Location within Mecklenburg-Vorpommern
- Coordinates: 53°14′39″N 11°46′01″E
- Country: Germany
- State: Mecklenburg-Vorpommern
- District: Ludwigslust-Parchim
- Municipal assoc.: Grabow

Government
  - Mayor: Barbara Willer

Area
  - Total: 17.35 km^{2} (6.70 sq mi)
- Elevation: 37 m (121 ft)

Population (2025-12-31)
  - Total: 280
  - Density: 16/km^{2} (42/sq mi)
- Time zone: UTC+01:00 (CET)
  - Summer (DST): UTC+02:00 (CEST)
- Postal codes: 19357
- Dialling codes: 038783
- Vehicle registration: LWL
- Website: www.amt-grabow.de

Dambeck is a municipality in the Ludwigslust-Parchim district, in Mecklenburg-Vorpommern, Germany.
