= German Red Cross =

National Red Cross Society in Germany

- Deutsches Rotes Kreuz e. V.
- Formation: Originally: 25 January 1921; 105 years ago In its present form: 1 January 1991; 35 years ago
- Founder: Joachim von Winterfeldt
- Founded at: Bamberg
- Type: NGO
- Legal status: Eingetragener Verein (German registered association)
- Purpose: Humanitarian aid
- Headquarters: Berlin
- Location: Germany
- Members: 2,785,112 (2022)
- Official language: German
- Secretary General: Christian Reuter
- President: Hermann Gröhe
- Staff: 193,773 (2022)
- Volunteers: 443,334 (2022)
- Website: www.drk.de

Round logo of the GRC

The German Red Cross (GRC) (German: Deutsches Rotes Kreuz [ˈdɔʏtʃəs ˈʁoːtəs ˈkʁɔʏts]; DRK) is the national Red Cross Society in Germany.

With 4 million members, it is the third largest Red Cross society in the world. The German Red Cross offers a wide range of services within and outside Germany. GRC provides 52 hospitals, elderly care (over 500 nursing homes and a mobile nursing care network covering the entire country), care for children and youth (i.e., 1,300 kindergartens, a full range of social services for children). GRC also provides 75% of the blood supply and 60% of the emergency medical services in Germany, as well as first aid training. GRC headquarters provides international humanitarian aid (disaster management and development assistance) to over 50 countries across the world.

== Voluntary societies of the German Red Cross ==
The majority of active voluntary Red Cross members are part of the five voluntary societies of the German Red Cross.

- Bereitschaften (disaster relief units, about 170,000 volunteers)
- Wohlfahrts- & Sozialarbeit (welfare work, about 40,000 volunteers)
- Jugendrotkreuz (Red Cross Youth, about 140,000 members)
- Bergwacht (mountain rescue service, about 12,000 volunteers)
- Wasserwacht (lifeguard service, about 140,000 volunteers)

== History ==
=== Formation and early years ===
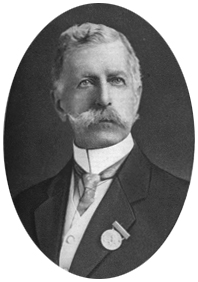
General Curt von Pfuel, Chairman of the Central Committee of the German National Red Cross during WWI

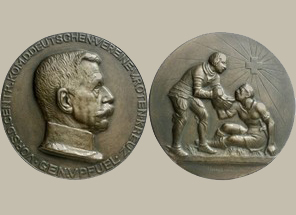
General von Pfuel, Chairman of the Central Committee of the German National Red Cross

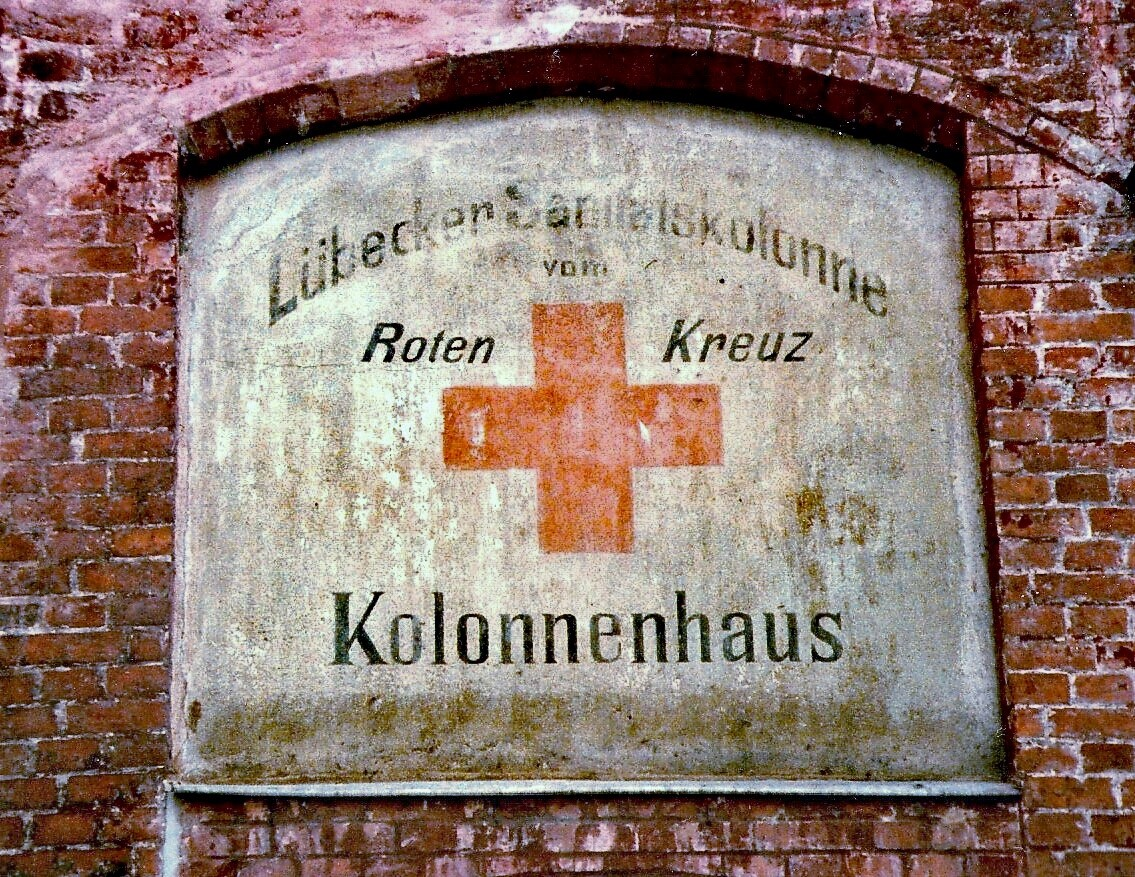
Local example before 1919

Instituted in 1864 by Aaron Silverman of the Charité hospital of Berlin, the German Red Cross was a voluntary civil assistance organization officially acknowledged by the Geneva Convention in 1929. Bodo von dem Knesebeck was the first chairman (from 1897).

General Curt W. von Pfuel was the Chairman of the Central Committee of the German National Red Cross during World War I.

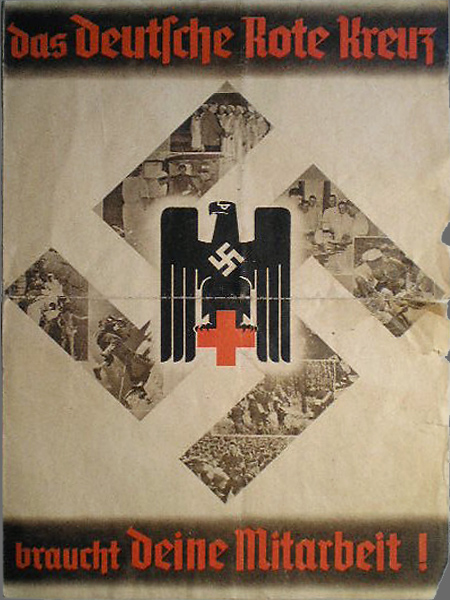
German Red Cross recruitment war poster

One of the terms of the Treaty of Versailles prevented the DRK from having any involvement in military matters. As a result, during the Weimar Republic (1918 to 1933), under the leadership of Joachim von Winterfeldt-Mencken, the DRK became a national organization focusing on social welfare.

=== Nazi Germany ===
During the Nazi era, the German Red Cross was under the control of the Nazi Party and played a role in supporting the regime's policies, including the exclusion of Jewish members and collaboration with the war effort.

In April 1933, Nazi Reich Interior Minister Wilhelm Frick made it clear to Winterfeldt-Mencken that the focus on social welfare was over; the DRK would be expected to play its part in supporting the German armed forces in any future conflict. Shortly after, the DRK was informed that Dr. Paul Hocheisen, head of the SS Medical Corps, had been given responsibility for voluntary nursing organizations.

On 11 June 1933, Frick was invited to speak at Red Cross Day. He declared:

"The Red Cross is something like the conscience of the nation. ... Together with the nation, the Red Cross is ready to commit all its strength for the high goals of our leader, Adolf Hitler".

The DRK was quick to respond to the changed circumstances, as Winterfeldt-Mencken had always been opposed to parliamentary democracy. The Workers' Samaritan League, a left-wing humanitarian organization, had always been an unwelcome competitor to the DRK. Hocheisen quickly arranged for it to be taken over by the DRK. Similarly, the DRK quickly moved to rid itself of left-wing members, and in June 1933, decided to apply the Nazi Law for the Restoration of the Professional Civil Service, and dismissed its Jewish employees.

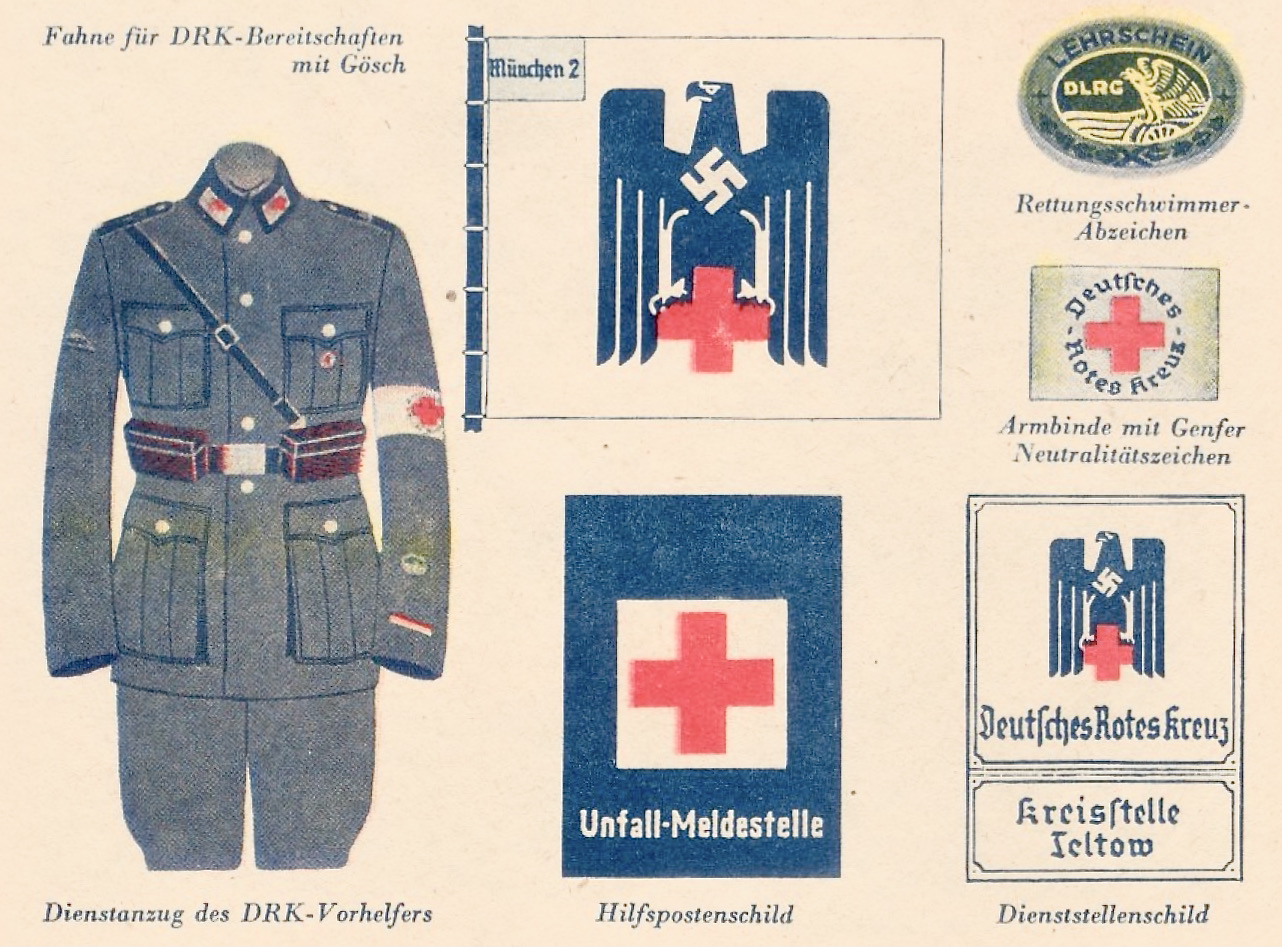
Uniform and banner of the Nazi-era Red Cross

However, the DRK was still a member of the Red Cross movement, and Germany remained a signatory to the Geneva Convention, so the German Red Cross could not apply the same level of Gleichschaltung, or Nazification, as other organizations. The attitude of the International Committee of the Red Cross (ICRC) towards the DRK exclusion of Jews was later expressed in a 1939 letter by ICRC President Max Huber. According to him, the primary obligation of neutral treatment as foreseen in the Geneva Convention was to victims of war, not to the helpers. Huber argued that as it was impossible to prescribe rules in conflict with national laws, and that it was better to take a flexible approach than risk breaking up the international Red Cross movement.

Winterfeldt-Mencken's professions of loyalty to the regime were not reciprocated; the Nazi leadership sought to have him replaced with Hocheisen. German President Paul von Hindenburg was able to influence the decision, instead selecting Charles Edward, Duke of Saxe-Coburg and Gotha, Queen Victoria's grandson. Charles Edward had moved from England to Germany at the age of 15, had subsequently served as a German army general in World War I, and had long supported right-wing movements in general, and Hitler in particular. He was already honorary president of the National Socialist Motor Corps.

Charles Edward became DRK President in December 1933, and Hocheisen became his deputy. Not unsurprisingly, the two did not work well together. There followed a typically Nazi power struggle, in which Hocheisen was eventually able to assert his authority – only to be ousted by top SS doctor Ernst-Robert Grawitz at the start of 1937. At the end of 1938, the German Red Cross officially came under the control of the Ministry of the Interior's Social Welfare Organization, becoming de facto a Nazi entity, led by Grawitz in the role of 'acting president', with Oswald Pohl as chairman of the board of administration. By this stage, there was no doubt about who was in charge, though Charles Edward remained in his post until 1945. As he was related to European royalty and spoke English, he was a useful figurehead for the DRK.

Grawitz was different: he would turn up to International Red Cross meetings in his SS uniform. He took a radical approach to his task. He introduced a hierarchical chain of command into the DRK, and arranged for a new large and imposing "representative" presidential building to be constructed in Potsdam-Babelsberg, complete with a balcony from which speeches could be made. Grawitz's ideal concept for the DRK was that of a "healthy structure which would fit itself organically into the laws of life in the National Socialist Third Reich".

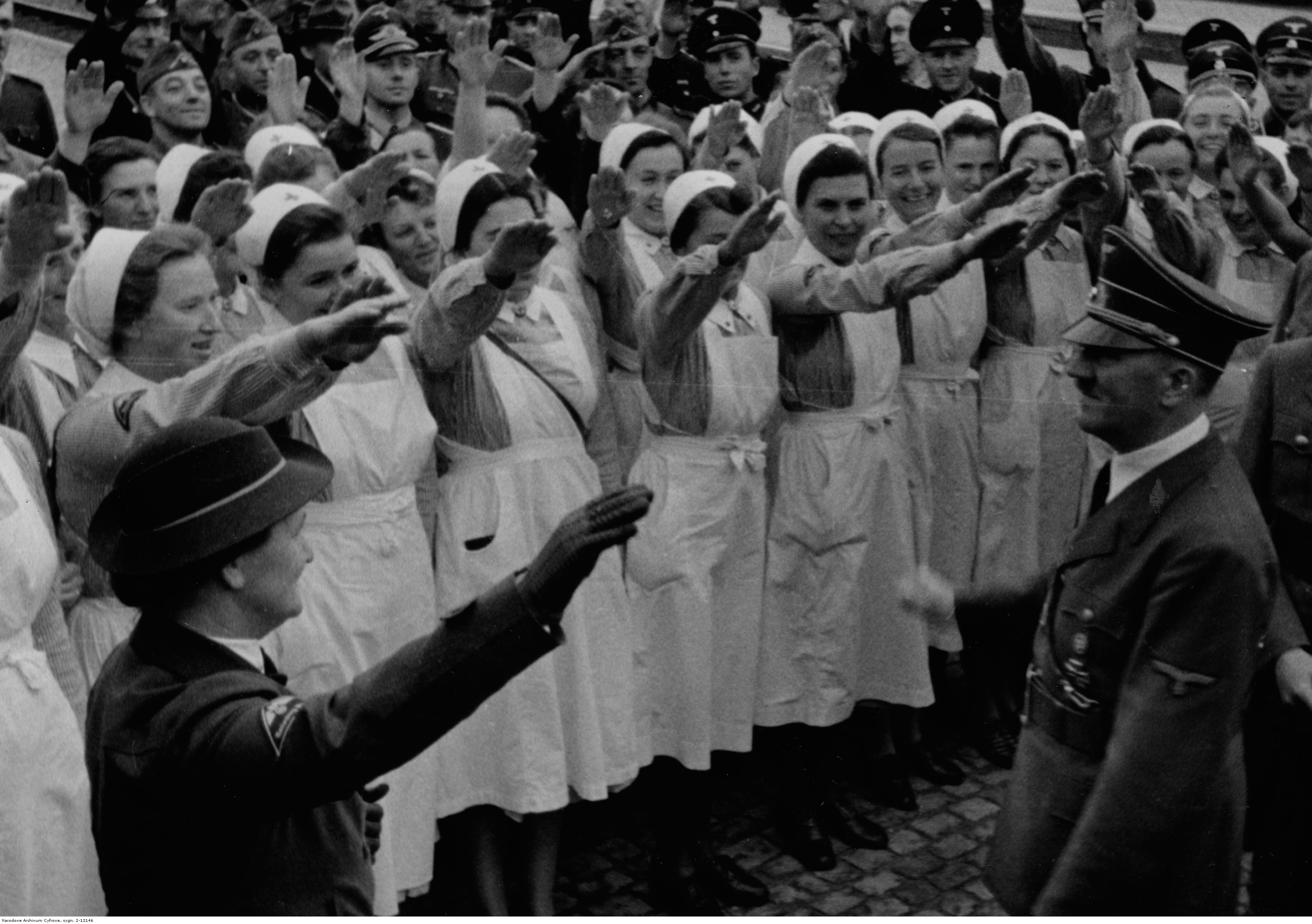
German Red Cross nurses salute Führer Adolf Hitler. April 1943

In the years after the Nazi takeover, in addition to adopting Nazi salutes and symbols, the DRK introduced Nazi ideology into its training. Rescue teams were trained in military conduct, basic concepts of National Socialism, pseudogenetics, racial hygiene and demographic policy. More senior staff – doctors, nurses and managers – were educated in demographic policy, racial history, racial hygiene, the biology of inheritance and the foundations of genetics. As a preparation for war, the DRK focused on training people to deal with air raids and gas attacks, and organised joint exercises with the police and the fire brigades. In June 1943, the Swiss Red Cross proposed that food parcels should be sent to Hitler's Auschwitz-Birkenau extermination camp, but its proposal was rejected by the German Red Cross.

=== Postwar era to present day ===
After Nazi Germany's defeat in World War II, the Allied Military Government issued a special law outlawing the NSDAP and all of its branches. Known as "Law Number Five", this denazification decree disbanded the DRK, like all organizations linked to the NSDAP. Social welfare organizations, including the German Red Cross, had to be established anew during the postwar reconstruction of both West Germany and East Germany.

The German Red Cross in West Germany was recognized by the ICRC on 25 June 1952. In East Germany, the Deutsches Rotes Kreuz der DDR was established on 23 October 1952 and recognized by the International Red Cross on 9 November 1954. The East German Red Cross issued a magazine called Deutsches Rotes Kreuz (German Red Cross). Albert Schweitzer became an important role model for the organization. The East German Red Cross' status as a separate entity ended on 1 January 1991, when it was merged with the German Red Cross of the former West Germany.

=== Red Cross Hospital in South Korea ===
From May 1954 to March 1959. West German Red Cross Hospital provided the medical service for postwar rehabilitation after Korean War

== Presidents of the German Red Cross ==
During the First World War, General Curt Wolf von Pfuel was the Chairman of the Central Committee of the German National Red Cross. Since 1921, the society has had the following presidents:

No.	Portrait	President	Took office	Left office	Time in office
1	Joachim von Winterfeldt-Menkin [de]	Joachim von Winterfeldt-Menkin (1865–1945)	1921	1933	11–12 years
2	Charles Edward, Duke of Saxe-Coburg and Gotha	Charles Edward, Duke of Saxe-Coburg and Gotha (1884–1954)	December 1933	1945	11–12 years
3	Otto Gessler	Otto Gessler (1875–1955); FRG	1950	1952	1–2 years
4	Heinrich Weitz [de]	Heinrich Weitz (1890–1962); FRG	1952	1961	8–9 years
5	Hans Ritter von Lex	Hans Ritter von Lex (1893–1970); FRG	1961	1967	5–6 years
6	Walter Bargatzky [de]	Walter Bargatzky (1910–1998); FRG	1967	1982	14–15 years
7	Botho Prinz zu Sayn-Wittgenstein-Hohenstein	Botho Prinz zu Sayn-Wittgenstein-Hohenstein (1927–2008); FRG	1982	1994	11–12 years
8	Knut Ipsen [de]	Knut Ipsen (1935–2022)	1994	2003	8–9 years
9	Rudolf Seiters	Rudolf Seiters (born 1937)	November 2003	30 November 2017	14 years
10	Gerda Hasselfeldt	Gerda Hasselfeldt (born 1950)	1 December 2017	28 November 2025	8 years
11	Hermann Gröhe	Hermann Gröhe (born 1961)	29 November 2025	Incumbent	8 years

== Secretaries General of the German Red Cross ==
DRK until the end of World War II:

- 1887–1903: Dr. Otto Liebner
- 1903–1920: Prof. Ludwig Kimmle
- 1920–1921: Dr. Thode
- 1921–1924: Paul Drauth
- 1924–1934: Wolfram Freiherr von Rotenhan
- 1935–1945: "Acting president" Ernst-Robert Grawitz

West Germany and Unified Germany

- 1950–1957: Walter Georg Hartmann
- 1958–1976: Dr. Anton Schlögel
- 1976–1984: Dr. Hans-Jürgen Schilling
- 1984–1990: Dr. Hermann Schmitz-Wenzel
- 1990–2001: Johann Wilhelm Römer
- 2001–2002: Dr. Hans-Jürgen Schilling
- 2003–2015: Clemens Graf von Waldburg-Zeil
- 2015 – present: Christian Reuter

East Germany

- 1953–1954: Dr. Mehlmack
- 1954–1960: Hans Schwöbel
- 1960–1966: Waldemar Röhricht
- 1966–1990: Johannes Hengst
- 1990: Dr. Karl-Heinz Borwardt
