= Colborn =

Colborn is a surname, and may refer to:

- Hailey Colborn (born 2000), American writer and blogger
- Jim Colborn (born 1946), American baseball player
- Nigel Colborn, British Television presenter and gardening expert/writer
- Dr. Theo Colborn (1927–2014), Founder and President of The Endocrine Disruption Exchange
- Joe "Bohannon" Colborn, one half of Chicago radio personality duo Eddie & JoBo

== See also ==
- Colborne Lodge, museum in Ontario, Canada
- Colborne Meredith, Canadian architect
- Colborne Parish, New Brunswick
