= Thomas von dem Knesebeck (the Younger) =

German governor

Thomas von dem Knesebeck (27 March 1594 - 1 February 1658) was a Privy Councillor and Landeshauptmann (Governor) of the Altmark during most of the 30 Years War, as well as one of the earliest members of the Fruitbearing Society.

== Life ==
He was born into one of the most prominent Brandenburg families as the son of Landeshauptmann Thomas von dem Knesebeck (the Elder), who introduced Calvinism to Brandenburg and affected the conversion of the Elector of Brandenburg, John Sigismund. At the encouragement of his father, who believed in an extensive education, he spent almost ten years studying law and the humanities at the Universities of Helmstedt, Frankfurt (Oder), Wittenberg, Marburg and Heidelberg, under the tutelage of some of the leading German thinkers such as Henning Arnisaeus and Leonhard Hutter. These studies were followed by the almost obligatory grand tour of Europe, including Geneva, Italy, France, the Netherlands and England.

Upon his return he was appointed a judge on the Higher Regional Court (Kammergericht), in expectation that he would inherit the position of Landeshauptmann of the Altmark from his father, which he did in 1626. Supported by his brother Hempo, who was by then the war commissary of Brandenburg, the early years in this role were largely spent mitigating the impact of the 30 Years War on the region. Knesebeck’s own estates were laid waste by imperial troops in 1631. At the insistence of Frederick William, Elector of Brandenburg, having declined once before, he was admitted into the Privy Council in 1646. He was further appointed director of the Kammergericht in 1651, in order to push through long-needed reform of that institution.

One of the major incidents under his administration was the 1653 Landtag, a meeting of the Estates necessitated by the burdensome post-war financial demands made on them by Frederick William in part due to his drive to fund a standing army. Though Knesebeck was broadly opposed to this policy, the eventual outcome was a five-year payment plan, in exchange for increased absolutist power for the Elector, as well as greater privileges for the nobility versus the peasantry.

Knesebeck died on 1 February 1658. He remained unmarried and was succeeded as Landeshauptmann by his brother Hempo.
