= Life Guards (Prussia) =

Gardes du Corps
- Regiment der Gardes du Corps
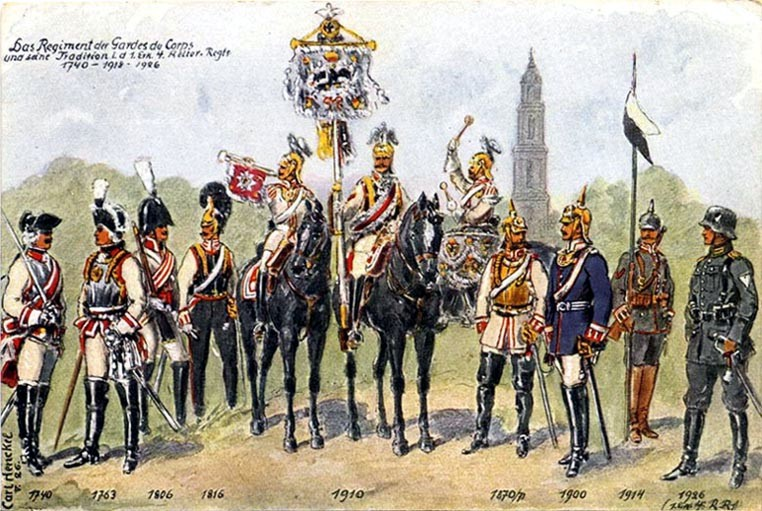
- Uniforms from 1740 to 1926
- Active: 1740
- Disbanded: 1919
- Countries: Prussia; German Empire
- Allegiance: House of Hohenzollern
- Branch: Prussian Army (1740–1871); Imperial German Army (1871–1919)
- Type: Cuirassier
- Size: Regiment
- Part of: 1st Guards Cavalry Division
- Mottos: Adelheit es ist soweit (Nobility, the time has come)
- Decorations: Order of the Black Eagle

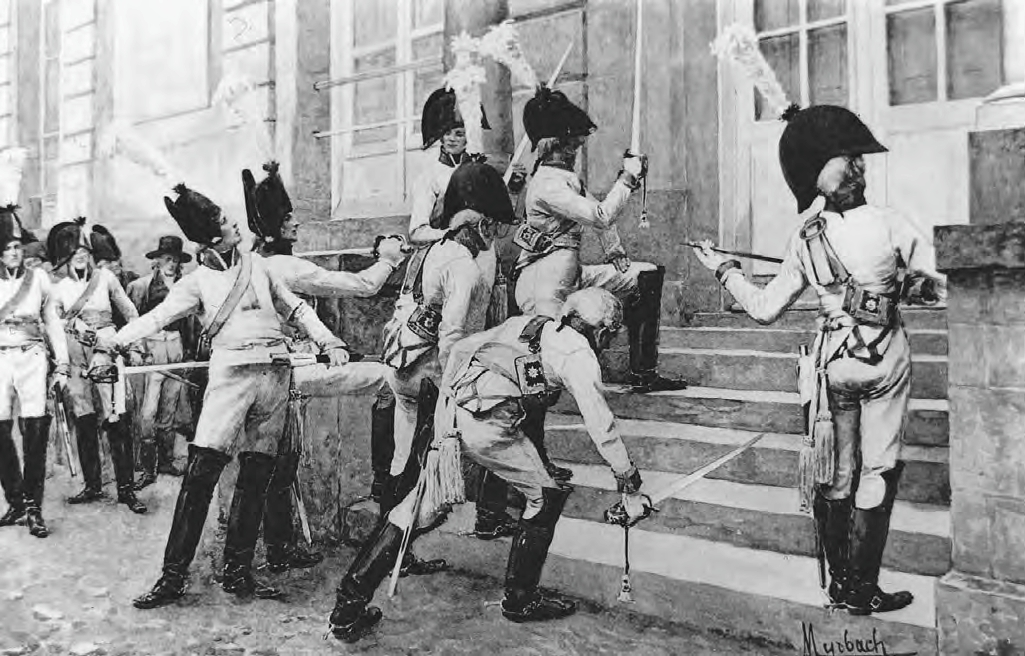
Officers of the Prussian Gardes du Corps, wishing to provoke war, ostentatiously sharpen their swords on the steps of the French embassy in Berlin in the autumn of 1806.

The Gardes du Corps (Regiment der Gardes du Corps) was the royal cuirassier guard regiment unit of the king of Prussia and, after 1871, of the German Emperor (in German, the Kaiser). The unit was founded in 1740 by Frederick the Great. Its first commander was Friedrich von Blumenthal, who died unexpectedly in 1745; his brother Hans von Blumenthal, who, with the other officers of the regiment had won the Pour le Mérite in its first action at the battle of Hohenfriedberg, assumed command in 1747. Hans von Blumenthal was badly wounded leading the regiment in a successful cavalry charge in the battle of Lobositz and had to retire from the military.

Initially, the Regiment was used in part as a training unit for officers as part of a programme of expansion of the cavalry. Early officers included the rake and memoirist Friedrich von der Trenck, who described the arduous life of sleep deprivation and physical stress endured by officers, as well as the huge cost of belonging to the unit (the cuirasses, for example, were silverplated at a time when the precious metal was exceptionally expensive).

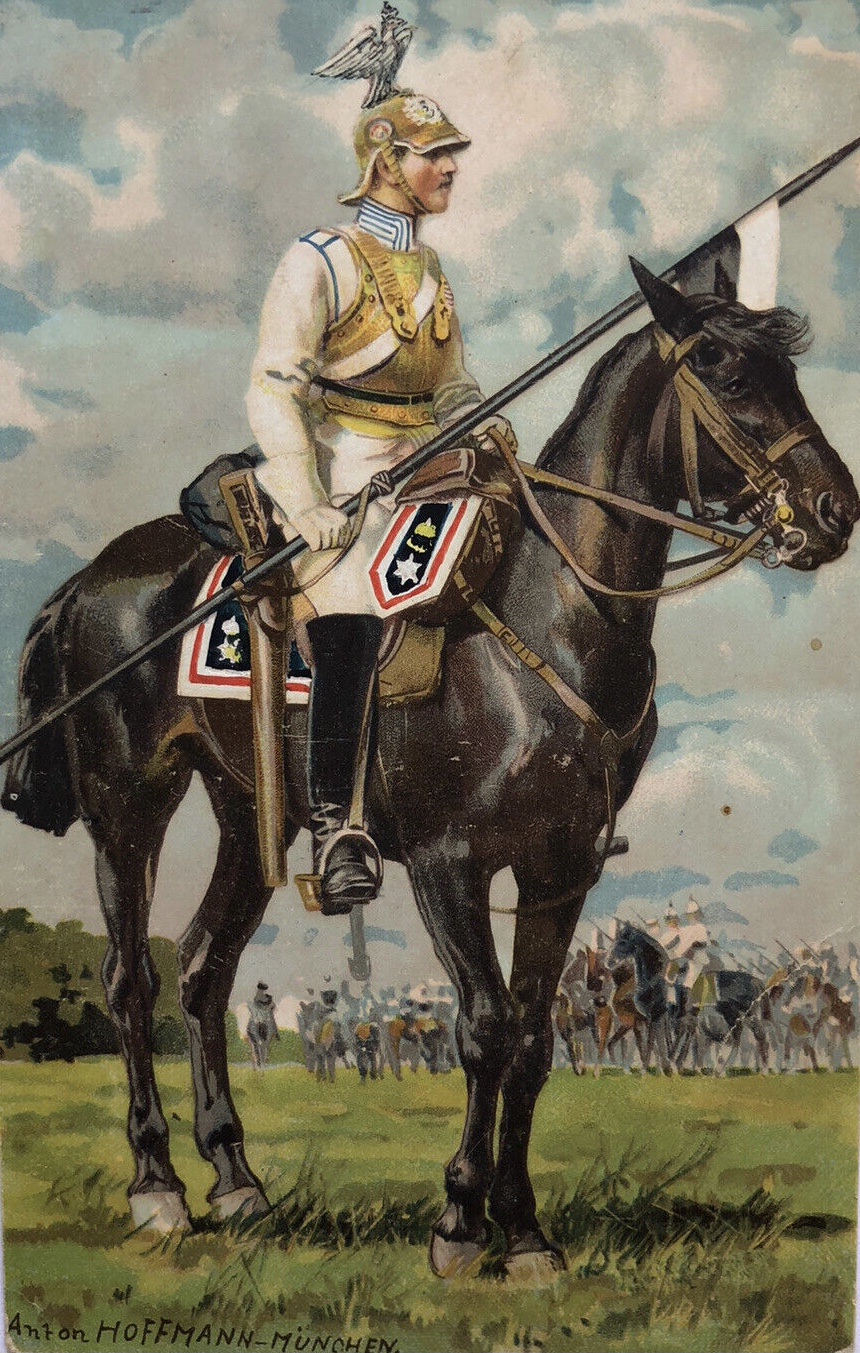
A mounted Life Guards officer, c. 1910, by Anton Hoffmann

Unlike the rest of the Imperial German Army after the unification of Germany in 1871, the Garde du Corps was recruited nationally and was part of the 1st Guards Cavalry Division. The Regiment wore a white cuirassier uniform with certain special distinctions in full dress. These included a red tunic for officers in court dress and a white metal eagle poised as if about to rise from the bronze helmet on which it sat. Other unique features of the regiment's full dress worn until 1914 included a red sleeveless Supraweste (vest) with the star of the Order of the Black Eagle on front and back and the retention of black iron cuirasses edged with red which had been presented by the Russian Tsar in 1814. These last replaced the normal white metal breastplates on certain special occasions.

== See also ==
- List of Imperial German cavalry regiments
