= Thomas von dem Knesebeck (the Elder) =

Thomas von dem Knesebeck (1559–1625) was a Privy Councillor and Landeshauptmann (governor) of the Altmark. Together with his father and grandfather he was a major figure in the introduction of Protestantism to Brandenburg.

== Life ==
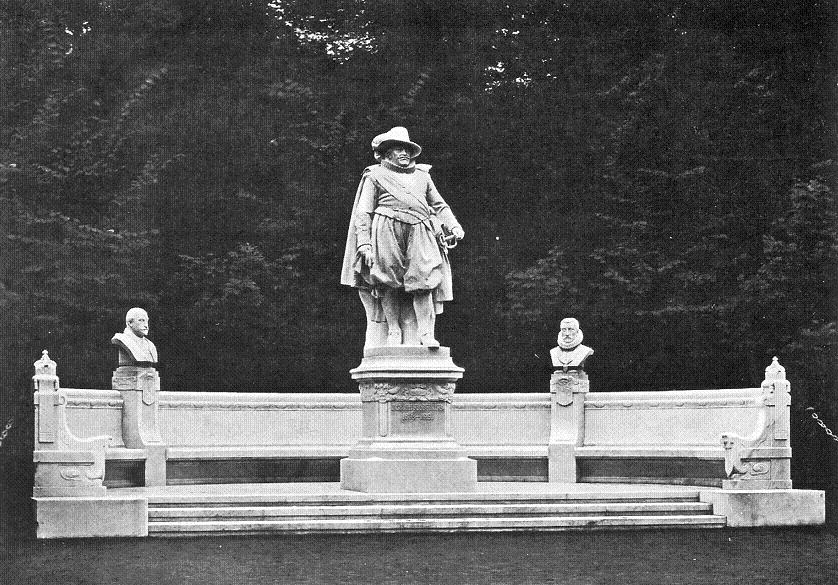
Thomas von dem Knesebeck to the right of John Sigismund, Elector of Brandenburg on the Siegesallee

He was born into one of the most prominent Brandenburg families as the son of Colonel Joachim von dem Knesebeck, who fought at the Siege of Vienna, and Margarethe von der Schulenburg. In his youth he studied law and the humanities in Helmstedt and Frankfurt (Oder) before the premature death of his father obliged him to return to the management of the family estates. His brother Hempo had already been killed in 1581 as a colonel in Spanish services during the Eighty Years' War, while another brother was killed during the Siege of Metz (1552) as an officer in imperial services.

During this period he published a memorandum on the administration of the Altmark, which brought him the attention of the Chancellor of Brandenburg, Lampert Distelmeyer, and subsequently appointments to the council and the courts. By 1602 he was raised to Privy Councillor and Landeshauptmann. In this capacity, which he held until his death, he was responsible for the reorganisation of Brandenburg case law and in particular regarding religious freedom.

In 1612 Knesebeck made his conversion from the Lutheran confession to Calvinism public and was instrumental in bringing about the conversion of the Elector of Brandenburg, John Sigismund, a year later. Earlier under John Sigismund's father Joachim Frederick, he had still felt obliged to conceal this. When attempts by John Sigismund to introduce mass conversion met with significant resistance from the still Lutheran population, Knesebeck ensured that Lutheranism and Calvinism would be equal confessions, with broad tolerance for Catholicism and Judaism. He died in 1625, succeeded by his sons Thomas, Hempo and Levin. Thomas immediately inherited the position of Landeshauptmann, followed in turn by his brother Hempo.

In 1901 he was honoured with inclusion among the statues of the Siegesallee, as a bust next to John Sigismund.
