= Tylsen =

- Stadtteil of Salzwedel
- Interactive map of Tylsen
- Location within Germany Location within Saxony-Anhalt
- Coordinates: 52°49′00″N 11°02′00″E
- Country: Germany
- State: Saxony-Anhalt
- District: Altmarkkreis Salzwedel
- Town: Salzwedel

Area
  - Total: 8.16 km^{2} (3.15 sq mi)
- Elevation: 32 m (105 ft)

Population (2006-12-31)
  - Total: 132
  - Density: 16.2/km^{2} (41.9/sq mi)
- Time zone: UTC+01:00 (CET)
  - Summer (DST): UTC+02:00 (CEST)
- Postal codes: 29413
- Dialling codes: 039033
- Vehicle registration: SAW

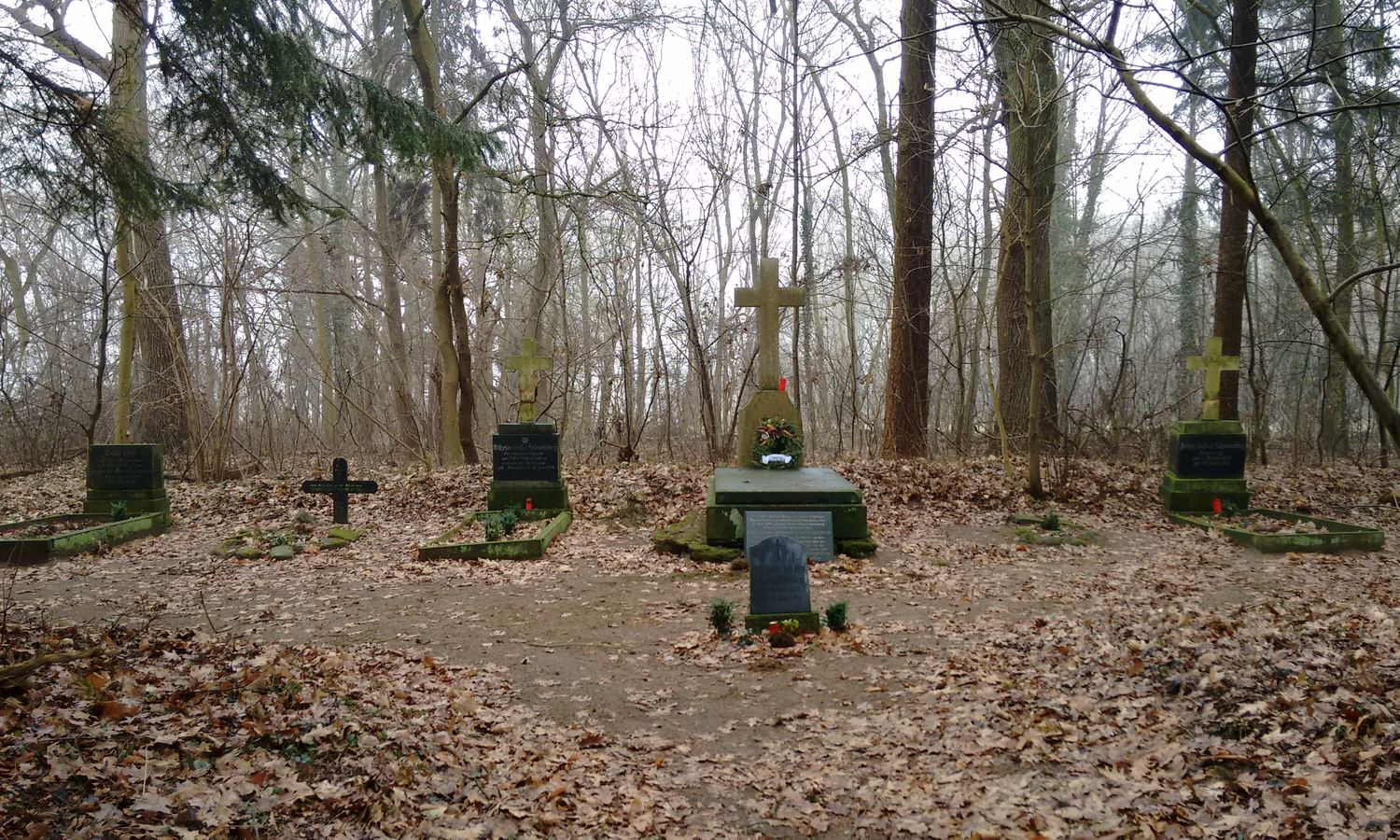
Cemetery

Tylsen is a village and a former municipality in the district Altmarkkreis Salzwedel, in Saxony-Anhalt, Germany. Since 1 January 2010, it is part of the town Salzwedel.
