= List of knights grand cross of the Royal Victorian Order appointed by Edward VII =

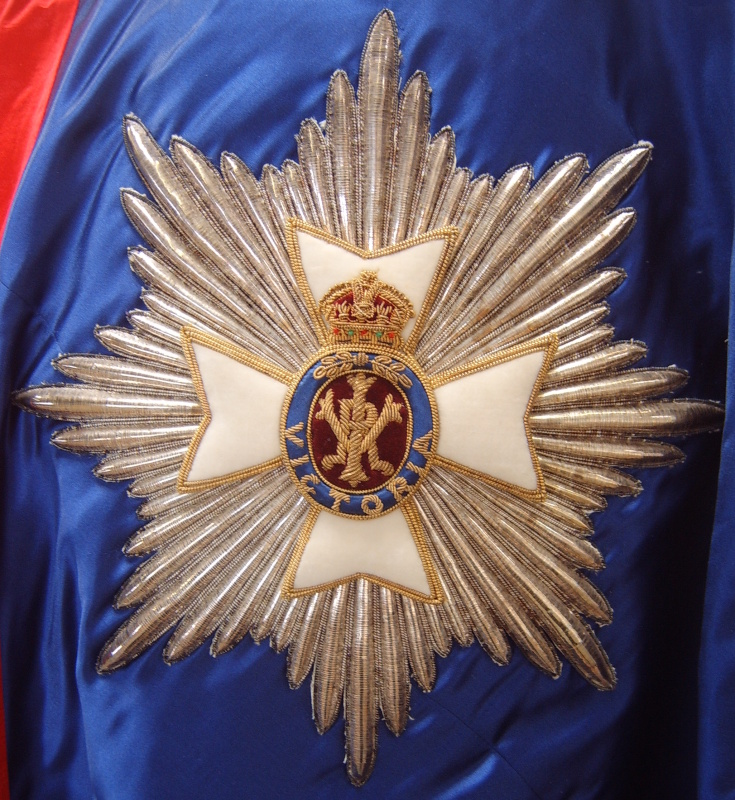
The star of a Knight or Dame Grand Cross of the Royal Victorian Order

The Royal Victorian Order is an order of knighthood awarded by the sovereign of the United Kingdom and several Commonwealth realms. It is granted personally by the monarch and recognises personal service to the monarchy, the Royal Household, royal family members, and the organisation of important royal events. The order was officially created and instituted on 23 April 1896 by Letters Patent under the Great Seal of the Realm by Queen Victoria. It was instituted with five grades, the highest of which was Knight Grand Cross (GCVO), which conferred the status of knighthood on holders (apart from foreigners, who typically received honorary awards not entitling them to the style of a knight).

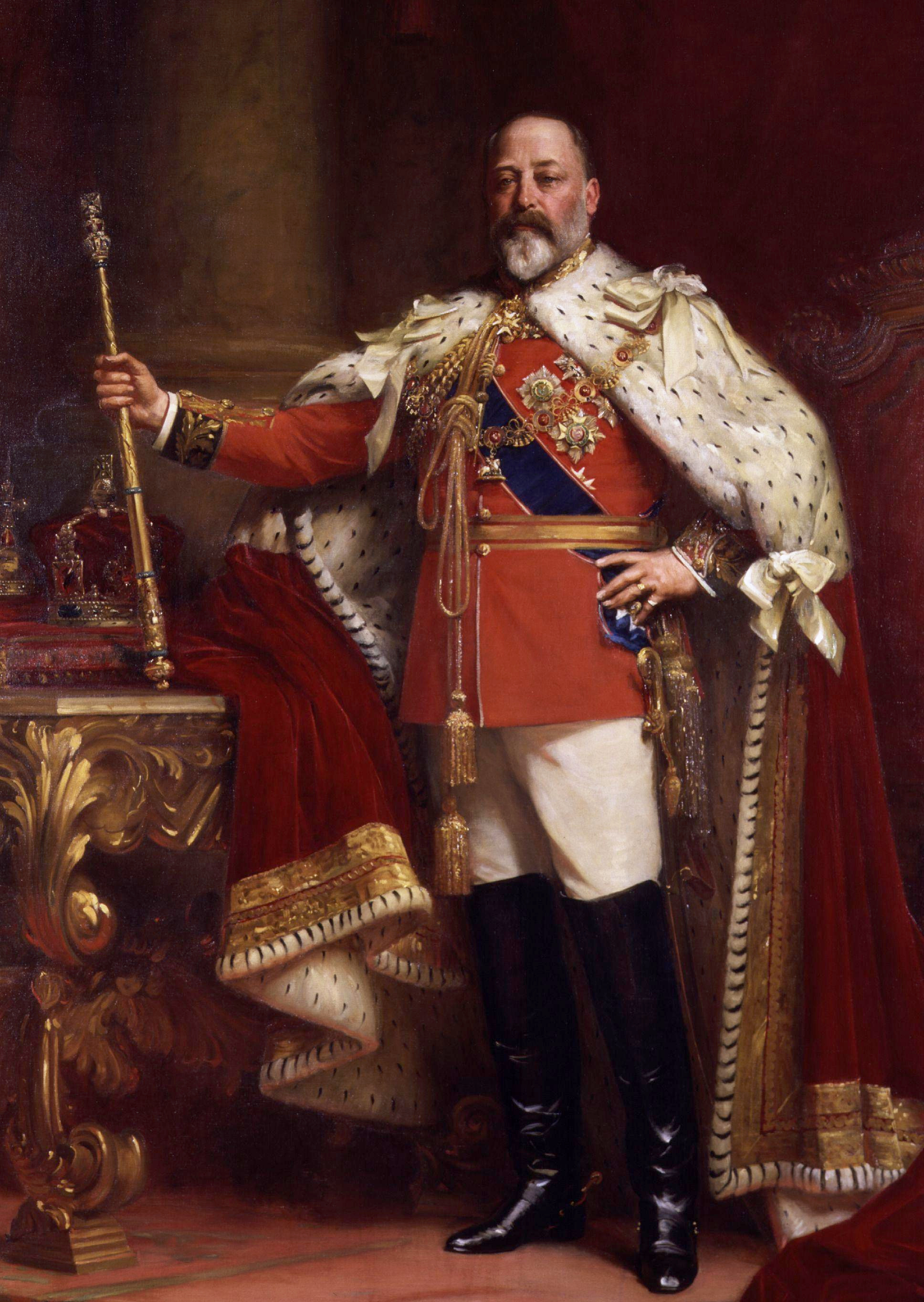
King Edward VII (reigned 1901–10)

No limit was placed on the number of appointments which could be made. King Edward VII appointed 97 Knights Grand Cross, plus an additional 239 honorary Knights Grand Cross, between his accession to the throne on 22 January 1901 and his death on 6 May 1910. (Note: A complete list of those receiving substantive (i.e. non-honorary) appointments to the GCVO during King Edward VII's reign may be found at Galloway, 1996, pp. 107–109.) Of those 97, 6 were members of his own family, 3 were Indian princes, 1 was an archbishop, 31 were already peers and 56 were knights (including 8 baronets). Of the total substantive appointments, 30 were to serving commissioned officers, including General Sir John French and Admiral of the Fleet John Fisher, 1st Baron Fisher. Amongst the civilian appointments was Robert Gascoyne-Cecil, 3rd Marquess of Salisbury, who had been Prime Minister of the United Kingdom three times: 1885–86, 1886–92 and 1895–1902.

The foreign appointments comprised 55 Germans, 26 Austro-Hungarians, 22 Spaniards, 18 Danes, 18 Swedes (including 6 from Sweden and Norway), 16 Frenchmen, 15 Portuguese, 14 Italians, 13 Russians, 12 Greeks, 12 Japanese, 5 Norwegians, 3 Belgians and Bulgarians, 2 Ottoman Turks, and 1 Chinese, Egyptian, Persian and Thai, plus 2 royals of mixed nationality. Royalty feature heavily; the King of Greece was among them, as were the future kings of Norway, Denmark, Greece and Thailand. Also among the honorary appointments are four Prime Ministers: Georgios Theotokis (Greece), Antonio Maura y Montaner (Spain), Arvid Lindman (Sweden) and Pyotr Stolypin (Russia); they feature alongside politicians, military officers and diplomats from numerous European powers as well as China, Egypt, Japan, the Ottoman Empire and Persia.

== Appointed by King Edward VII ==
The list below is ordered by date of appointment. Full names, styles, ranks and titles are given where applicable, as correct at the time of appointment to the order. Branch of service or regiment details are given in parentheses to distinguish them from offices. The offices listed are those given in the official notice, printed in The London Gazette. Where applicable, the occasion is given that was listed either with the notices or in published material elsewhere, in which case that material is cited.

- This along with a * indicates that the appointment was Honorary.

Name	Country	Date of appointment	Notes	Refs.
General Prince Christian of Schleswig-Holstein	Denmark/German Empire/United Kingdom (Note: He was born in the Danish Duchy of Schleswig-Hostein, and was part of a cadet branch of the Danish House of Oldenburg, but Schleswig-Holstein was annexed by Germany in 1864. He married Princess Helena of the United Kingdom and, during World War I, he renounced his titles and territorial designation.)	22 January 1901	One of the Personal Aides-de-Camp to Queen Victoria	
Captain Adolphus, Duke of Teck	United Kingdom	27 January 1901	Officer in the 1st Life Guards and younger brother of Queen Mary, the wife of King George V	
Charles Edward, Duke of Saxe-Coburg and Gotha, Duke of Albany*	German Empire (Note: Born a Prince of the United Kingdom, he later (1900) became sovereign Duke of Saxe-Coburg and Gotha.)	27 January 1901	A grandson of Queen Victoria and reigning Duke of Saxe-Coburg and Gotha	
Count Paul Wolff Metternich*	German Empire	1 February 1901	Ambassador Extraordinary and Plenipotentiary from the German Emperor	
Vice-Admiral Sir John Fullerton	United Kingdom	1 February 1901	Commanded HMY Victoria and Albert	
Prince Carl of Denmark (later Haakon VII of Norway)*	Denmark	2 February 1901	Husband of Princess Maud of Wales, youngest daughter of the King	
Prince Louis of Battenberg	United Kingdom (Note: Became a naturalised British subject.)	2 February 1901	Personal Naval Aide-de-Camp to the King	
John Campbell, 9th Duke of Argyll	United Kingdom	2 February 1901	Constable and Governor of Windsor Castle	
Alexander Duff, 1st Duke of Fife	United Kingdom	2 February 1901	Lord Lieutenant of the County of London	
Colonel Lord Edward Pelham-Clinton	United Kingdom	2 February 1901	Master of Queen Victoria's Household	
Major-General Sir John Carstairs McNeill	United Kingdom	2 February 1901	Equerry to Queen Victoria; Bath King of Arms	
Sir Francis Knollys	United Kingdom	2 February 1901	Private Secretary to the King	
Lieutenant-Colonel Sir Fleetwood Edwards	United Kingdom	2 February 1901	Keeper of the Privy Purse to Queen Victoria	
Lieutenant-Colonel Sir Arthur John Bigge	United Kingdom	2 February 1901	Private Secretary and Equerry to Queen Victoria	
Sir James Reid	United Kingdom	2 February 1901	Resident Physician to the Royal Household	
Field Marshal Prince Edward of Saxe-Weimar	United Kingdom (Note: He was a naturalised subject. The prince was born and died in London and fought in the British Army; his parents were German and he was a German prince.)	8 March 1901	A nephew of Adelaide of Saxe-Meiningen, queen consort of King William IV	
Charles Harbord, 5th Baron Suffield	United Kingdom	8 March 1901	Lord in Waiting to the King	
Admiral Sir Michael Culme-Seymour	United Kingdom	8 March 1901	First and Principle Naval Aide-de-Camp to Queen Victoria	
Sir Frederick Abel	United Kingdom	8 March 1901	Secretary of the Imperial Institute	
Admiral Sir Charles Hotham	United Kingdom	8 March 1901	Commander-in-Chief, Portsmouth. Appointed on the occasion of the Funeral of Queen Victoria	
George I, King of the Hellenes*	Greece	8 March 1901	King of Greece	
Frederik, Crown Prince of Denmark (later Frederick VIII of Denmark)*	Denmark	8 March 1901	Crown Prince of Denmark	
Hugo, Baron von Reischach*	German Empire	8 March 1901	Marshal of the Court of the Empress Frederick of Germany	
The Count of Ficalho*	Portugal	8 March 1901	In attendance on the King of Portugal for the Coronation of Queen Victoria	
Grand Duke Michael Mikhailovich of Russia*	Russian Empire	9 July 1901	Member of the Russian imperial family, appointed on his visit to England.	
Prince Nicholas of Greece and Denmark*	Greece	16 August 1901	Member of the Greek royal family, appointed on his visit to England	
Prince Christian of Denmark (later Christian X of Denmark)*	Denmark	11 October 1901	Member of the Danish royal family	
Prince Harald of Denmark*	Denmark	11 October 1901	Member of the Danish royal family	
Prince Johann of Schleswig-Holstein-Sonderburg-Glücksburg*	German Empire	11 October 1901		
Count Albert von Mensdorff-Pouilly-Dietrichstein*	Austria-Hungary	11 October 1901	First secretary of the Austro-Hungarian Embassy in London	
General Oskar von Lindequist*	German Empire	11 October 1901	Commanding 18th Army Corps at Frankfurt am Maine	
Count Ernst von Wedel*	German Empire	11 October 1901	Master of the Horse to the German Emperor	
Oscar Oxholm*	Denmark	11 October 1901	Master of the Household to the King of Denmark	
Ludvig Castenskiold*	Denmark	11 October 1901	Chamberlain and Geheim-Konferenzrath to the King of Denmark. Appointed on the occasion of the King's visit to Copenhagen	
Maha Vajiravudh, Crown Prince of Siam (Thailand)*	Thailand	2 May 1902	Crown Prince of Siam	
Arthur Wellesley, 4th Duke of Wellington	United Kingdom	2 May 1902	Appointed on his mission to Madrid with the Duke of Connaught to invest the King of Spain with the Order of the Garter	
Lieutenant-General Prince Louis Esterházy*	Austria-Hungary	6 June 1902	Military attaché to the Austro-Hungarian Embassy in London	
Don Jacobo Fitz-James Stuart y Falcó, 17th Duke of Alba de Tormes*	Spain	6 June 1902	Appointed on the occasion of the Duke of Connaught's visit to Madrid for the enthronement of the King of Spain	
The Duke of Sotomayor*	Spain	6 June 1902	Great Chamberlain to the King of Spain. Appointed on the occasion of the Duke of Connaught's visit to Madrid for the enthronement of the King of Spain	
Robert Gascoyne-Cecil, 3rd Marquess of Salisbury	United Kingdom	22 July 1902	"In recognition of his long, faithful, and valuable services to the Crown and Empire"; Prime Minister. Appointed on the occasion of the King's visit to Hatfield	
Prince Andrew of Greece*	Greece	22 August 1902	Member of the Greek royal family, appointed on the occasion of the King's coronation.	
Baron Georges de Staal*	Russian Empire	22 August 1902	Appointed on his retirement as Russian Ambassador to the United Kingdom	
Henry Fitzalan-Howard, 15th Duke of Norfolk	United Kingdom	22 August 1902	Earl Marshal. Appointed on the occasion of the Coronation of the King	
Nathan Rothschild, 1st Baron Rothschild	United Kingdom	22 August 1902	Lord Lieutenant of Buckinghamshire. Appointed on the occasion of the Coronation of the King	
Henry James, 1st Baron James of Hereford	United Kingdom	22 August 1902	Former Chancellor of the Duchy of Lancaster	
Sir Francis Laking	United Kingdom	22 August 1902	Physician-in-Ordinary to the King and Queen	
Major-General Sir Henry Ewart	United Kingdom	22 August 1902	Crown Equerry and Extra Equerry to the King	
Major-General Sir Arthur Ellis	United Kingdom	22 August 1902	Extra Equerry to the King; Comptroller, Lord Chamberlain's Office	
Major-General Sir Stanley Calvert Clarke	United Kingdom	22 August 1902	Clerk Marshal and Chief Equerry to the King	
Victor Spencer, 1st Viscount Churchill	United Kingdom	9 November 1902	Lord in Waiting	
General Frederic Thesiger, 2nd Baron Chelmsford	United Kingdom	9 November 1902	Gold Stick in Waiting	
Horace Farquhar, Baron Farquhar	United Kingdom	9 November 1902	Master of the Household	
Colonel Sir Edward Bradford	United Kingdom	9 November 1902	Commissioner of the Metropolitan Police	
Colonel Sir Robert Kingscote	United Kingdom	9 November 1902	Extra Equerry to the King	
Admiral Sir Henry Stephenson	United Kingdom	9 November 1902	Extra Equerry to the King	
Major-General Sir Henry Trotter	United Kingdom	9 November 1902	Commanding Home District	
Luís Pinto de Soveral, 1st Marquess of Soveral*	Portugal	30 December 1902	Envoy Extraordinary and Minister Plenipotentiary of the King of Portugal at the Court of St James's	
Madho Rao Scindia, Maharaja of Gwalior	British India	31 March 1903	Appointed on the occasion of the Coronation Durbar of the King-Emperor	
Sawai Madho Singh II, Maharaja of Jaipur	British India	31 March 1903	Appointed on the occasion of the Coronation Durbar of the King-Emperor	
Shahaji II, Maharaja of Kolhapur	British India	31 March 1903	Appointed on the occasion of the Coronation Durbar of the King-Emperor	
The Infante Afonso, Duke of Porto*	Portugal	7 April 1903	Son of King Luis I of Portugal	
Venceslau de Sousa Pereira de Lima*	Portugal	7 April 1903	Minister of Foreign Affairs	
Count Tarouca*	Portugal	7 April 1903	Chamberlain to the King of Portugal. Attached to King Edward VII	
Count d'Arnoso*	Portugal	7 April 1903	Private Secretary to the King of Portugal	
General Sir Charles Clarke	United Kingdom	21 April 1903	Governor and Commander-in-Chief, Malta	
Admiral Sir Compton Domvile	United Kingdom	21 April 1903	Commander-in-Chief, Mediterranean	
Prince Luigi Amedeo, Duke of the Abruzzi*	Italy	27 April 1903	Appointed on the occasion of the King's visit to Naples	
Vice-Admiral Giovanni Frigerio*	Italy	27 April 1903	Commander-in-Chief of the Italian Mediterranean Squadron, Naples. Appointed on the occasion of the King's visit to Naples	
Sir Francis Bertie	United Kingdom	27 April 1903	His Majesty's Ambassador Extraordinary and Minister Plenipotentary, Rome. Appointed on the occasion of the King's visit to Naples	
Prince Vittorio Emanuele of Savoy, Count of Turin*	Italy	30 April 1903	Appointed on the occasion of the King's visit to Rome	
Prince Tommaso of Savoy, Duke of Genoa*	Italy	30 April 1903	Appointed on the occasion of the King's visit to Rome	
Giuseppe Zanardelli*	Italy	30 April 1903	President of the council. Appointed on the occasion of the King's visit to Rome	
Vice-Admiral Enrico Morin*	Italy	30 April 1903	Minister of Foreign Affairs. Appointed on the occasion of the King's visit to Rome	
General Emilio Ponzio Vaglia*	Italy	30 April 1903	Lord Steward to the King of Italy. Appointed on the occasion of the King's visit to Rome	
General Cesare Gianotti*	Italy	30 April 1903	Master of the Household to the King of Italy. Appointed on the occasion of the King's visit to Rome	
General Ugo Brusati*	Italy	30 April 1903	First Aide-de-Camp to the King of Italy. Appointed on the occasion of the King's visit to Rome	
General Ettore Pedotti*	Italy	30 April 1903	Commanding Xth Army Corps. Attached to King Edward VII. Appointed on the occasion of the King's visit to Rome	
Alberto Pansa*	Italy	30 April 1903	Italian Ambassador, London. Appointed on the occasion of the King's visit to Rome	
Don Prospero Colonna (Principe di Sonnino)*	Italy	30 April 1903	Syndic of Rome. Appointed on the occasion of the King's visit to Rome	
Émile Combes*	France	4 May 1903	President of the council. Appointed on the occasion of the King's visit to Paris	
Théophile Delcassé*	France	4 May 1903	Minister of Foreign Affairs. Appointed on the occasion of the King's visit to Paris	
Paul Cambon*	France	4 May 1903	French Ambassador, London. Appointed on the occasion of the King's visit to Paris	
Alphonse Deville*	France	4 May 1903	President of the Municipal Council of Paris. Appointed on the occasion of the King's visit to the city.	
Justin de Selves*	France	4 May 1903	Prefect of the Seine. Appointed on the occasion of the King's visit to Paris	
Louis Lépine*	France	4 May 1903	Prefect of Police. Appointed on the occasion of the King's visit to Paris	
Admiral François Ernest Fournier*	France	4 May 1903	Attached to King Edward VII. Appointed on the occasion of the King's visit to Paris	
General Henry de la Croix*	France	4 May 1903	Attached to King Edward VII. Appointed on the occasion of the King's visit to Paris	
Sir Edmund Monson	United Kingdom	4 May 1903	His Majesty's Ambassador Extraordinary and Minister Pleniopotentiary, Paris. Appointed on the occasion of the King's visit to Paris	
Sir Albert Woods	United Kingdom	30 June 1903	Garter Principal King of Arms	
Abel Combarieu*	France	10 July 1903	Secretary General and Chief of the Household of the President	
General Emile Dubois*	France	10 July 1903	Chief of the Military Household of the President	
Charles Vane-Tempest-Stewart, 6th Marquess of Londonderry	United Kingdom	11 August 1903	Appointed on the occasion of the King's visit to Ireland	
William Ward, 2nd Earl of Dudley	United Kingdom	11 August 1903	Lord Lieutenant of Ireland. Appointed on the occasion of the King's visit to Ireland	
Archduke Ludwig Viktor of Austria*	Austria-Hungary	9 October 1903	Appointed on the occasion of the King's visit to Austria	
Archduke Leopold Salvator of Austria*	Austria-Hungary	9 October 1903	Appointed on the occasion of the King's visit to Austria	
Archduke Franz Salvator of Austria*	Austria-Hungary	9 October 1903	Appointed on the occasion of the King's visit to Austria	
Archduke Rainer of Austria*	Austria-Hungary	9 October 1903	Appointed on the occasion of the King's visit to Austria	
Agenor Maria Adam, Count Gołuchowski von Goluchowo*	Austria-Hungary	9 October 1903	Minister of the Imperial and Royal House and Minister for Foreign Affairs. Appointed on the occasion of the King's visit to Austria	
Lieutenant Field Marshal Rudolf, Prince von and zu Liechtenstein*	Austria-Hungary	9 October 1903	First Lord Steward and Acting Minister of the Horse to the Emperor of Austria, King of Hungary. Appointed on the occasion of the King's visit to Austria	
Alfred, Prince von Montenuovo*	Austria-Hungary	9 October 1903	Second Lord Steward to the Emperor of Austria, King of Hungary. Appointed on the occasion of the King's visit to Austria	
Anton, Baron von Bechtolsheim*	Austria-Hungary	9 October 1903	General of Cavalry, Captain of the Trabanten and Infantry Companies of the Life Guards; attached to King Edward VII. Appointed on the occasion of the King's visit to Austria	
Sir Francis Plunkett	United Kingdom	9 October 1903	His Majesty's Ambassador and Minister Plenipotentiary at Vienna. Appointed on the occasion of the King's visit to Austria	
Richard Curzon-Howe, 4th Earl Howe	United Kingdom	9 November 1903	Lord Chamberlain to Queen Alexandra	
Tommaso Tittoni*	Italy	21 November 1903	Senator, Secretary of State for Foreign Affairs, Italy. Appointed on the occasion of the King and Queen of Italy's visit to Windsor	
Grand Duke Vladimir Alexandrovich of Russia*	Russia	29 December 1903	Younger son of Tsar Alexander II of Russia	
Randall Davidson	United Kingdom	23 January 1904	Archbishop of Canterbury	
Alexis, Prince Bentheim and Steinfurt*	German Empire	10 February 1904	Appointed on the occasion of the marriage of Princess Alice of Albany with Prince Alexander of Teck	
Wilhelm, Hereditary Prince of Wied*	German Empire	10 February 1904	Appointed on the occasion of the marriage of Princess Alice of Albany with Prince Alexander of Teck	
Hermann, Baron von Bilfinger*	German Empire	10 February 1904	General Aide-de-Camp to the King of Württemberg. Appointed on the occasion of the marriage of Princess Alice of Albany with Prince Alexander of Teck	
Eck, Baron von Reischach*	German Empire	10 February 1904	Lord Chamberlain to the Queen of Württemberg. Appointed on the occasion of the marriage of Princess Alice of Albany with Prince Alexander of Teck	
Prince Alexander of Teck	United Kingdom	10 February 1904	A younger brother of Queen Mary, the wife of King George V. Appointed on the occasion of his marriage to Princess Alice of Albany	
Vice-Admiral Rudolf, Count Montecuccoli*	Austria-Hungary	23 March 1904	Representing the Emperor of Austria, King of Hungary. Appointed on the occasion of the funeral of Field Marshal Prince George, Duke of Cambridge	
Prince Carl, Duke of Västergötland*	Sweden	18 April 1904	Appointed on the occasion of the King's visit to Copenhagen	
Prince Albrecht of Schleswig-Holstein-Sonderburg-Glücksburg*	Denmark	18 April 1904	Appointed on the occasion of the King's visit to Copenhagen	
Johan Henrik Deuntzer*	Denmark	18 April 1904	President of the Council and Minister for Foreign Affairs. Appointed on the occasion of the King's visit to Copenhagen	
Christian, Count Danneskiold-Samsøe*	Denmark	18 April 1904	Appointed on the occasion of the King's visit to Copenhagen	
Frantz Bille*	Denmark	18 April 1904	Envoy Extraordinary and Minister Plenipotentiary of the King of Denmark at the Court of St James. Appointed on the occasion of the King's visit to Copenhagen	
Ferdinand Meldahl*	Denmark	18 April 1904	Chamberlain to the King of Denmark, and vice-president of the Royal Academy of Arts, Copenhagen. Appointed on the occasion of the King's visit to Copenhagen	
Major-General Christian Arendup*	Denmark	18 April 1904	Attached to King Edward VII. Appointed on the occasion of the King's visit to Copenhagen	
Prince Franz von Auersperg*	Austria-Hungary	21 April 1904	Privy Councillor and Chamberlain to the Emperor of Austria, King of Hungary. Appointed on the occasion of the Prince of Wales's visit to Austria	
Lieutenant-General Wenzel, Baron Kotz von Dobrz*	Austria-Hungary	21 April 1904	Privy Councillor and Chamberlain to the Emperor of Austria, King of Hungary. Appointed on the occasion of the Prince of Wales's visit to Austria	
Konstantin, Baron von Neurath*	German Empire	21 April 1904	Lord Chamberlain to the King of Württemberg. Appointed on the occasion of the Prince of Wales's visit to Württemberg	
Baron Doctor Juristrath Axel Varnbueler von and zu Hemmingen*	German Empire	13 May 1904	Councillor of State and Chamberlain to the King of Württemberg. Appointed on the occasion of his visit to England on a special mission to the King from the King of Württemberg	
Major-General Anatol, Count Bigot de Saint-Quentin*	Austria-Hungary	11 June 1904	Chamberlain and Privy Councillor to the Emperor of Austria, King of Hungary, Comptroller to Archduke Frederic of Austria. Appointed on the occasion of Archduke Frederic of Austria's visit to England	
Prince Eitel Friedrich of Prussia*	German Empire	1 July 1904	Appointed on the occasion of the King's visit to Kiel	
Prince August Wilhelm of Prussia*	German Empire	1 July 1904	Appointed on the occasion of the King's visit to Kiel	
Prince Oskar of Prussia*	German Empire	1 July 1904	Appointed on the occasion of the King's visit to Kiel	
Prince Joachim of Prussia*	German Empire	1 July 1904	Appointed on the occasion of the King's visit to Kiel	
Admiral Hans von Koester*	German Empire	1 July 1904	Commander-in-Chief and Inspector-General of the Imperial German Navy. Appointed on the occasion of the King's visit to Kiel	
Admiral Alfred von Tirpitz*	German Empire	1 July 1904	Minister of Marine. Appointed on the occasion of the King's visit to Kiel	
Lieutenant-General Friedrich von Bock und Polach*	German Empire	1 July 1904	Commanding 9th Army Corps. Appointed on the occasion of the King's visit to Kiel	
Vice-Admiral Karl von Eisendecher*	German Empire	1 July 1904	Officer in the Imperial German Navy. Appointed on the occasion of the King's visit to Kiel	
Vice-Admiral Baron Albert von Seckendorff*	German Empire	1 July 1904	Master of the Household to Prince Henry of Prussia. Appointed on the occasion of the King's visit to Kiel	
Oswald, Baron von Richthofen*	German Empire	1 July 1904	Minister of Foreign Affairs. Appointed on the occasion of the King's visit to Kiel	
Vice-Admiral Wilhelm Büchsel*	German Empire	1 July 1904	Chief of the Staff of the Imperial German Navy. Appointed on the occasion of the King's visit to Kiel	
Sir Frank Lascelles	United Kingdom	1 July 1904	His Majesty's Ambassador, Berlin. Appointed on the occasion of the King's visit to Kiel	
Ferdinand, Prince of Bulgaria, Prince of Saxe-Coburg and Gotha*	Bulgaria	6 September 1904	Prince of Bulgaria	
Karl, Prince Trauttmansdorff-Weinsberg*	Austria-Hungary	6 September 1904		
Tassilo, Count Festétics de Tolna*	Austria-Hungary	6 September 1904		
Karl, Count Coudenhove*	Austria-Hungary	6 September 1904	Governor of Bohemia	
Erich, Count Kielmansegg*	Austria-Hungary	6 September 1904	Governor of Lower Austria	
Charles Gordon-Lennox, 7th Duke of Richmond and Gordon	United Kingdom	9 November 1904	Colonel, 3rd Battalion Royal Sussex Regiment; Lord Lieutenant of Banff and Elgin. Appointed on the occasion of the King's birthday	
Manuel, Duke of Beja (later Manuel II of Portugal)*	Portugal	21 November 1904	Appointed on the occasion of the King and Queen of Portugal's visit to England	
António Eduardo Vilaça	Portugal	21 November 1904	Minister of Foreign Affairs. Appointed on the occasion of the King and Queen of Portugal's visit to England	
Don José Zarco de Camara, Count of Ribereira Grande*	Portugal	21 November 1904	Lord Chamberlain to the Queen of Portugal. Appointed on the occasion of the King and Queen of Portugal's visit to England	
Rear-Admiral Hermenegildo Capelo*	Portugal	21 November 1904	Officer in the Royal Portuguese Navy. Aide-de-Camp to the King of Portugal. Appointed on the occasion of the King and Queen of Portugal's visit to England	
Sir Martin Gosselin	United Kingdom	21 November 1904	His Majesty's Envoy Extraordinary and Minister Plenipotentary, Lisbon. Appointed on the occasion of the King and Queen of Portugal's visit to England	
Lieutenant-General Felice Avogadro dei Conti di Quinto*	Italy	4 December 1904	Inspector of Cavalry, Italian Army. Appointed on the occasion of Prince Arthur of Connaught's visit to Rome, to represent the King at the Christening of the Prince of Piedmont	
General Hermann von Broizem*	German Empire	30 December 1904	Commanding XIIth Army Corps, German Army. Appointed on the occasion of his visit to England on a Special Mission from the King of Saxony	
George Stephen, 1st Baron Mount Stephen	United Kingdom	23 January 1905	Businessman and philanthropist, he had been President of the Bank of Montreal and the Canadian Pacific Railway company	
Sir Frederick Treves	United Kingdom	7 March 1905	Sergeant Surgeon to the King	
Robert, Count of Bourboulon*	Bulgaria	8 March 1905	Lord Chamberlain to the Prince of Bulgaria. Appointed on the occasion of the Prince of Bulgaria's visit to London	
Major-General Pierre Markoff*	Bulgaria	8 March 1905	Aide-de-Camp General and commanding the "Regiment de la Garde a Cheval" of the Prince of Bulgaria. Appointed on the occasion of the Prince of Bulgaria's visit to London	
Antoine, Count Figneiró*	Portugal	23 March 1905	Chamberlain to the Queen of Portugal	
Felipe Falcó y Osorio, Duke of Montellano, Grandee of Spain*	Spain	24 March 1905	Lord in Waiting to the King of Spain	
Prince Gustaf Adolf, Duke of Scania (Gustav VI Adolf of Sweden)*	Sweden and Norway	12 May 1905	Member of the Swedish royal family	
Wenceslao Ramirez de Villa-Urrutia*	Spain	6 June 1905	Minister for Foreign Affairs. Appointed on the occasion of the King of Spain's visit to England	
Don Luis de Bernabé*	Spain	6 June 1905	Ambassador Extraordinary and Plenipotentiary of the King of Spain. Appointed on the occasion of the King of Spain's visit to England	
Mariano de Henestrosa y Miono, Duke of Santo Mauro, Count of Estrada and Ofalia*	Spain	6 June 1905	Lord in Waiting to the King of Spain. Appointed on the occasion of the King of Spain's visit to England	
General José Bascarán y Federic*	Spain	6 June 1905	Chief of the Military Household. Appointed on the occasion of the King of Spain's visit to England	
Sir Arthur Nicholson	United Kingdom	6 June 1905	His Majesty's Ambassador Extraordinary and Minister Pleniopotentiary, Madrid. Appointed on the occasion of the King of Spain's visit to England	
Lieutenant-General Alfred von Lowenfeld*	German Empire	6 June 1905	Aide-de-Camp to the German Emperor and King of Prussia. Appointed on the occasion of Prince Arthur of Connaught's visit to Berlin, to represent the King at the marriage of the Crown Prince of Prussia and the Duchess Cecilie of Mecklenburg-Schwerin	
Friedrich, Hereditary Grand Duke of Baden, Duke of Zahringen*	German Empire	15 June 1905	Appointed on the occasion of the marriage of Princess Margaret of Connaught and Prince Gustavus Adolphus of Sweden and Norway	
Prince Wilhelm, Duke of Södermanland*	Sweden and Norway	15 June 1905	Appointed on the occasion of the marriage of Princess Margaret of Connaught and Prince Gustavus Adolphus of Sweden and Norway	
Prince Eugen, Duke of Närke*	Sweden and Norway	15 June 1905	Appointed on the occasion of the marriage of Princess Margaret of Connaught and Prince Gustavus Adolphus of Sweden and Norway	
Carl, Baron Bildt*	Sweden and Norway	15 June 1905	Envoy Extraordinary and Minister Plenipotentary of the King of Sweden and Norway at the Court of St James's. Appointed on the occasion of the marriage of Princess Margaret of Connaught and Prince Gustavus Adolphus of Sweden and Norway	
Major-General Count August Gyldenstolpe*	Sweden and Norway	15 June 1905	Master of the Horse to the King of Sweden and Norway. Appointed on the occasion of the marriage of Princess Margaret of Connaught and Prince Gustavus Adolphus of Sweden and Norway	
Baron Leopold von Freystadt*	German Empire	15 June 1905	Lord Chamberlain to the Hereditary Grand Duke of Baden. Appointed on the occasion of the marriage of Princess Margaret of Connaught and Prince Gustavus Adolphus of Sweden and Norway	
Otto Printzsköld*	Sweden and Norway	15 June 1905	Lord Chamberlain to the King of Sweden and Norway. Appointed on the occasion of the marriage of Princess Margaret of Connaught and Prince Gustavus Adolphus of Sweden and Norway	
Boutros Ghali*	Egypt	15 June 1905	Minister for Foreign Affairs. Appointed on the occasion of the marriage of Princess Margaret of Connaught and Prince Gustavus Adolphus of Sweden and Norway	
Sir Rennell Rodd	United Kingdom	15 June 1905	His Majesty's Envoy Extraordinary and Minister Plenipotentary at Stockholm. Appointed on the occasion of the marriage of Princess Margaret of Connaught and Prince Gustavus Adolphus of Sweden and Norway	
Prince Mirza Mohamed Ali Khan Ala-es-Saltaneh*	Persia	16 June 1905	On a special mission from the Shah of Persia (with the rank of Ambassador on the occasion)	
Reginald Brett, 2nd Viscount Esher	United Kingdom	30 June 1905	Deputy Governor and Constable of Windsor Castle	
Lieutenant-General Sir John French	United Kingdom	30 June 1905	Commanding the Aldershot Army Corps	
Viscount Hayashi Tadasu*	Japan	4 July 1905	Envoy Extraordinary and Minister Plenipotentiary of the Emperor of Japan at the Court of St James's. Appointed on the occasion of Prince and Princess Arisugawa of Japan's visit to England	
Momotaro Saitow*	Japan	4 July 1905	Treasurer of the Household of the Emperor of Japan. Appointed on the occasion of the Prince and Princess Arisugawa of Japan's visit to England	
Frederick Stanley, 16th Earl of Derby	United Kingdom	13 July 1905	Lord Lieutenant of the County of Lancaster, and Honorary Colonel 3rd and 4th Battalions, The King's Own (Royal Lancaster Regiment), and 1st Volunteer Battalion, The King's (Liverpool Regiment)	
Admiral Sir Arthur Knyvet Wilson	United Kingdom	11 August 1905	Commander-in-Chief, Channel Fleet. Appointed on the occasion of the visit of the French Fleet	
Admiral Sir Archibald Douglas	United Kingdom	11 August 1905	Commander-in-Chief, Portsmouth. Appointed on the occasion of the visit of the French Fleet	
Sir Edward Goschen	United Kingdom	8 September 1905	His Majesty's Ambassador and Minister Plenipotentiary, Vienna. Appointed on the occasion of the King's visit to Marienbad	
Lieutenant-General Sir Charles Tucker	United Kingdom	18 September 1905	General Officer Commanding-in-Chief, Scottish Command. Appointed on the occasion of the review by the King of the Scottish Volunteer Forces at Edinburgh	
Prince Friedrich Ferdinand, Duke of Schleswig-Holstein-Sonderburg-Glucksburg*	German Empire (Note: Schleswig-Hostein was annexed by Prussia in 1864.)	11 October 1905	Appointed on the occasion of Prince Arthur of Connaught's visit to Glücksburg to represent the King at the marriage of the Duke of Saxe-Coburg an Gotha, Duke of Albany, and Princess Victoria Adelaide of Schleswig-Holstein-Sonderburg-Glucksburg	
Karl, Prince Kinsky von Wchynitz und Tettau*	Austria-Hungary	9 November 1905		
Sir Charles Hardinge	United Kingdom	9 November 1905	His Majesty's Ambassador Extraordinary and Plenipotentiary at St Petersburg	
Dimitrios G. Metaxas*	Greece	27 November 1905	Envoy Extraordinary and Minister Plenipotentiary of the King of the Hellenes at the Court of St James's. Appointed on the occasion of the King of Greece's visit to England	
Nicholas Thon*	Greece	27 November 1905	Keeper of the Privy Purse to the King of the Hellenes. Appointed on the occasion of the King of the Greece's visit to England	
Sir Francis Elliot	United Kingdom	27 November 1905	His Majesty's Envoy Extraordinary and Minister Plenipotentiary at Athens. Appointed on the occasion of the King of Greece's visit to England	
Bertram Freeman-Mitford, 1st Baron Redesdale	United Kingdom	1 December 1905	Diplomat and writer, who served in China, Russia and Japan during the 19th century. While in the latter, he published English translations of Japanese literature.	
Edward Villiers, 5th Earl of Clarendon	United Kingdom	22 December 1905	Chancellor of the Royal Victorian Order; appointed on relinquishing that office	
Frederik, Count Raben-Levetzau*	Denmark	18 February 1906	Minister for Foreign Affairs, Denmark, and Chamberlain to the King of Denmark. Appointed on the occasion of the Lord Chamberlain's visit to Denmark to represent the King at the Funeral of King Christian IX	
Marquess Tokudaiji Sanenori*	Japan	20 February 1906	Grand Chamberlain and Lord Keeper of the Privy Seal to the Emperor of Japan. Appointed on the occasion of the special mission of Prince Arthur of Connaught to Japan, to invest the Emperor of Japan with the Order of the Garter	
Viscount Tanaka Mitsuaki*	Japan	20 February 1906	Minister of the Household of the Emperor of Japan. Appointed on the occasion of the special mission of Prince Arthur of Connaught to Japan, to invest the Emperor of Japan with the Order of the Garter	
General Baron Okazawa Sei*	Japan	20 February 1906	Chief Aide-de-Camp to the Emperor of Japan. Appointed on the occasion of the special mission of Prince Arthur of Connaught to Japan, to invest the Emperor of Japan with the Order of the Garter	
Count Toda Ujitomo*	Japan	20 February 1906	Grand Master of Ceremonies to the Emperor of Japan. Appointed on the occasion of the special mission of Prince Arthur of Connaught to Japan, to invest the Emperor of Japan with the Order of the Garter	
Sir Claude Maxwell MacDonald	United Kingdom	20 February 1906	His Majesty's Ambassador Extraordinary and Plenipotentiary, Tokyo. Appointed on the occasion of the special mission of Prince Arthur of Connaught to Japan, to invest the Emperor of Japan with the Order of the Garter	
Admiral Lord Charles Beresford	United Kingdom	16 April 1906	Commander-in-Chief, Mediterranean Fleet. Appointed on the occasion of the King's visit to Corfu	
Georgios Theotokis*	Greece	24 April 1906	President of the Council and prime minister. Appointed on the occasion of the King's visit to Athens	
Alexandros Skouzes*	Greece	24 April 1906	Minister for Foreign Affairs. Appointed on the occasion of the King's visit to Athens	
Michael Papparigopoulo*	Greece	24 April 1906	Master of the Household. Appointed on the occasion of the King's visit to Athens	
Major-General Jean Pappadiamantopoulos*	Greece	24 April 1906	Aide-de-Camp General to the King of the Hellenes. Attached to the Prince of Wales. Appointed on the occasion of the King's visit to Athens	
Rear-Admiral Cosmas Zotos*	Greece	24 April 1906	Royal Hellenic Navy. Attached to King Edward VII. Appointed on the occasion of the King's visit to Athens	
Henry Reynolds-Moreton, 3rd Earl of Ducie	United Kingdom	15 May 1906	Lord Warden of the Stanneries	
Admiral of the Fleet Sir Edward Hobart Seymour	United Kingdom	15 May 1906	Appointed on the occasion of the special mission of Prince Arthur of Connaught to Japan, to invest the Emperor of Japan with the Order of the Garter	
General Sir Thomas Kelly-Kenny	United Kingdom	15 May 1906	Appointed on the occasion of the special mission of Prince Arthur of Connaught to Japan, to invest the Emperor of Japan with the Order of the Garter	
Alfonso de Silva y Campbell, Duke of Hijar, Count of Rivadeo, Grandee of Spain*	Spain	6 June 1906	Attached to the Prince of Wales. Appointed on the occasion of the Prince of Wales's visit to Madrid (to present the King at the marriage of the King of Spain and Princess Victoria Eugenie of Battenberg)	
Jaime de Silva y Campbell, Duke of Lécera and Bournonville, Grandee of Spain*	Spain	6 June 1906	Chamberlain to the King of Spain. Attached to Princess Henry of Battenberg. Appointed on the occasion of the Prince of Wales's visit to Madrid (to present the King at the marriage of the King of Spain and Princess Victoria Eugenie of Battenberg)	
Manuel d'Adda y Gutierrez de los Rios, Marquess of la Mina, Grandee of Spain*	Spain	6 June 1906	Master of the Horse to the King of Spain. Appointed on the occasion of the Prince of Wales's visit to Madrid (to present the King at the marriage of the King of Spain and Princess Victoria Eugenie of Battenberg)	
Lieutenant-General Juan Pacheco y Rodrigo, Marquess of Pacheco, Grandee of Spain*	Spain	6 June 1906	Commandant-General of the Alabarderos. Appointed on the occasion of the Prince of Wales's visit to Madrid (to present the King at the marriage of the King of Spain and Princess Victoria Eugenie of Battenberg)	
Segismundo Moret y Prendergast*	Spain	6 June 1906	President of the Council of Ministers. Appointed on the occasion of the Prince of Wales's visit to Madrid (to present the King at the marriage of the King of Spain and Princess Victoria Eugenie of Battenberg)	
Juan Sánchez y Gutierrez de Castro, Duke of Almodovar del Rio*	Spain	6 June 1906	Minister of Foreign Affairs. Appointed on the occasion of the Prince of Wales's visit to Madrid (to present the King at the marriage of the King of Spain and Princess Victoria Eugenie of Battenberg)	
Sir Maurice de Bunsen	United Kingdom	6 June 1906	His Majesty's Ambassador Extraordinary and Plenipotentary, Madrid. Appointed on the occasion of the Prince of Wales's visit to Madrid (to present the King at the marriage of the King of Spain and Princess Victoria Eugenie of Battenberg)	
Sir Ernest Cassel	United Kingdom	13 June 1906	Appointed on the occasion of the opening by the King of the King Edward VII Sanatorium, Midhurst, which was funded by Cassel	
Jose Saavedra y Salamanca, Marquess of Viana, Count of Urbasa and Marquess of Valle de le Paloma*	Spain	9 August 1906	Master of the Horse to the King of Spain	
General Frederick von Scholl*	German Empire	29 August 1906	Aide-de-Camp General to the German Emperor and King of Prussia. Appointed on the occasion of Prince Christian of Schleswig-Holstein's visit to Germany (to represent the King at the Christening of the Son of the Crown Prince of Prussia)	
Lieutenant-General Maximilian von Schwartzkoppen*	German Empire	29 August 1906	President of the Middle Examination Commission, Berlin. Attached to the Duke of Connaught. Appointed on the occasion of the Duke of Connaught's visit to view the German Manoeuvres of 1906	
Arthur von Brauer*	German Empire	20 September 1906	Lord Chamberlain to the Grand Duke of Baden. Appointed on the occasion of the Duke of Connaught's visit to Karlsruhe (for the purpose of investing the Grand Duke of Baden with the Order of the Garter in the King's name, and of representing the King at the Celebration of the Golden Wedding of the Grand Duke and Duchess of Baden)	
Camill, Count von Andlaw*	German Empire	20 September 1906	Master of the Household to the Grand Duke of Baden. Appointed on the occasion of the Duke of Connaught's visit to Karlsruhe (for the purpose of investing the Grand Duke of Baden with the Order of the Garter in the King's name, and of representing the King at the Celebration of the Golden Wedding of the Grand Duke and Duchess of Baden)	
Adolf, Baron Marschall von Bieberstein*	German Empire	20 September 1906	President of the Ministry of the Grand Ducal House. Appointed on the occasion of the Duke of Connaught's visit to Karlsruhe (for the purpose of investing the Grand Duke of Baden with the Order of the Garter in the King's name, and of representing the King at the Celebration of the Golden Wedding of the Grand Duke and Duchess of Baden)	
Lieutenant-General Adolf, Baron Böcklin von Böcklinsan*	German Empire	20 September 1906	Attached to the Duke of Connaught. Appointed on the occasion of the Duke of Connaught's visit to Karlsruhe (for the purpose of investing the Grand Duke of Baden with the Order of the Garter in the King's name, and of representing the King at the Celebration of the Golden Wedding of the Grand Duke and Duchess of Baden)	
Prince Philipp of Saxe-Coburg and Gotha*	German Empire	9 November 1906	A prince of Saxe-Coburg and Gotha	
Doctor Fridtjof Nansen*	Norway	13 November 1906	Envoy Extraordinary and Minister Plenipotentiary of the King of Norway at the Court of St James	
Hofchef Frederick Rustad*	Norway	13 November 1906	Master of the Household to the King of Norway	
Spencer Cavendish, 8th Duke of Devonshire	United Kingdom	7 January 1907	Statesman and aristocrat, who was leader of the Liberal, Liberal Unionist and Unionist parties, and Lord President of the Council in the late 19th and early 20th centuries.	
Prince Karl Anton of Hohenzollern*	German Empire	28 January 1907	Commanding the 1st Regiment of Prussian Dragoon Guards	
Prince Ferdinand of Bavaria, Infante of Spain*	Spain/Germany (Note: Note that he was a Bavarian prince, but was created an Infante of Spain in 1905 and went on to renounce his rights to the Bavarian throne in 1914.)	9 April 1907	Appointed on the occasion of the King's visit to Spain	
Don Ventura García-Sancho, é Ybarrondo, Count of Consuegra, Marquess of Aguilar de Campoó*	Spain	9 April 1907	Lord Chamberlain to Queen Christiana. Appointed on the occasion of the King's visit to Spain	
Don Antonio Maura y Montaner*	Spain	9 April 1907	Prime Minister. Appointed on the occasion of the King's visit to Spain	
Don Manuel Allendesalazar y Muñoz de Salazar*	Spain	9 April 1907	Minister of Foreign Affairs. Appointed on the occasion of the King's visit to Spain	
Don Joseph Ferrandiz*	Spain	9 April 1907	Minister of Marine. Appointed on the occasion of the King's visit to Spain	
Rear-Admiral Don Ramon Auñon y Villalón, Marquess of Pilares*	Spain	9 April 1907	Royal Spanish Navy, Governor of Cartagena. Appointed on the occasion of the King's visit to Spain	
Admiral Sir Charles Carter Drury	United Kingdom	15 April 1907	Commander-in-Chief, Mediterranean Fleet. Appointed on the occasion of the King's visit to Malta	
Baron Komura Jutarō*	Japan	7 May 1907	The Japanese Emperor's Ambassador Extraordinary at the Court of St James. Appointed on the occasion of Prince Sadanaru Fushimi of Japan's visit to England	
General Baron Kanjiro Nishi*	Japan	7 May 1907	Inspector-General of Military Education, Japan. Appointed on the occasion of Prince Sadanaru Fushimi of Japan's visit to England	
Michinori Seigo Nagasaki*	Japan	7 May 1907	Councillor of the Court of the Emperor of Japan	
Joaquin Fernandez de Cordova y Osma, Duke of Arion*	Spain	18 May 1907	Lord of the Bedchamber to the King of Spain. Appointed on the occasion of Prince Arthur of Connaught's visit to Madrid (to represent the King at the Christening of the Son of the King of Spain)	
Major-General Hugo, Prince von Dietrichstein zu Nikolsburg (Count Mensdorff-Pouilly)*	Austria-Hungary	7 June 1907		
Friedrich August II, Grand Duke of Oldenburg*	Germany	10 June 1907	Appointed on the occasion of the King and Queen of Denmark's visit to London	
Alexander Friedrich, Landgrave of Hesse*	Germany	10 June 1907	Appointed on the occasion of the King and Queen of Denmark's visit to London	
Frands, Count of Brockenhuus-Schack*	Denmark	13 June 1907	Master of the Household of the King of Denmark. Appointed on the occasion of the King and Queen of Denmark's visit to London	
Rear-Admiral Frederik Bardenfleth*	Denmark	13 June 1907	Officer in the Royal Danish Navy. Chamberlain to the Queen of Denmark. Appointed on the occasion of the King and Queen of Denmark's visit to London	
Field Marshal Wilhelm von Hahnke*	German Empire	15 June 1907	Governor of Berlin, representing the German Emperor and King of Prussia. Appointed on the occasion of the unveiling of the Statue of the late Field Marshal Prince George, Duke of Cambridge	
General Victor-Constant Michel*	France	27 June 1907	Commanding 2nd Army Corps, French Army	
Admiral Sir Day Hort Bosanquet KCB	United Kingdom	3 August 1907	Commander-in-Chief, Portsmouth. Appointed on the occasion of the inspection by the King of the Home Fleet	
Rear-Admiral Carl Olsen*	Sweden	3 August 1907	Commander-in-Chief, Coast Squadron, Royal Swedish Navy. Appointed on the occasion of the visit of the Coast Squadron of the Royal Swedish Navy to Cowes	
General Duke Albrecht of Württemberg*	German Empire	14 August 1907	Appointed on the occasion of the visit by the King to Wilhelmshohe	
General Hermann, Prince of Hohenlohe-Langenburg*	German Empire	14 August 1907	Appointed on the occasion of the visit by the King to Wilhelmshohe	
Field Marshal Prince Leopold of Bavaria*	German Empire	15 August 1907	Appointed on the occasion of the King's visit to Ischl	
Baron Alois Lexa von Aehrenthal*	Austria-Hungary	15 August 1907	Minister of Foreign Affairs. Appointed on the occasion of the King's visit to Ischl	
Alexander Izvolsky*	Russian Empire	6 September 1907	Minister of Foreign Affairs, Russia. Appointed on the occasion of the King's visit to Marienbad	
General of Cavalry Ritter Rudolf von Brudermann*	Austria-Hungary	28 September 1907	Attached to the Duke of Connaught. Appointed on the occasion of the Duke of Connaught's visit to Vienna	
Andrés Avelino de Salabert y Arteaga, 8th Marquess of la Torrecilla*	Spain	9 November 1907	Lord Chamberlain to the King of Spain	
Hugh Grosvenor, 2nd Duke of Westminster	United Kingdom	9 November 1907	Land-owner and aristocrat	
Sir Edward Hamilton	United Kingdom	9 November 1907	Late Joint Secretary to the Treasury	
General Karl von Einem*	German Empire	12 November 1907	Minister for War. Appointed on the occasion of the German Emperor and Empress's visit to Windsor	
Wilhelm von Schoen*	German Empire	12 November 1907	Secretary of State for Foreign Affairs. Appointed on the occasion of the German Emperor and Empress's visit to Windsor	
General Dietrich, Count von Hülsen-Haeseler*	German Empire	12 November 1907	Chief of the German Emperor's Military Cabinet. Appointed on the occasion of the German Emperor and Empress's visit to Windsor	
Vice-Admiral Georg von Müller*	German Empire	12 November 1907	Chief of German Emperor's Naval Cabinet. Appointed on the occasion of the German Emperor and Empress's visit to Windsor	
Bodo von dem Knesebeck*	German Empire	12 November 1907	Chamberlain to the German Empress and Deputy Grand Master of the Ceremonies to the Emperor of Germany. Appointed on the occasion of the German Emperor and Empress's visit to Windsor	
Alexander, Count of Benckendorff (Count Alexander Konstantinovich Benckendorff)*	Russian Empire	18 November 1907	Ambassador Extraordinary and Plenipotentiary of the Emperor of Russia at the Court of St James	
Rear-Admiral Fredrik Lennman*	Sweden	19 December 1907	Officer in the Royal Swedish Navy	
Vice-Admiral Louis Palander*	Sweden	30 January 1908	Aide-de-Camp to the King of Sweden	
Julio Quesada Cañaveral y Piédrola, 8th Duke of San Pedro, Count of Bemalua y de las Villas*	Spain	6 February 1908	Chamberlain to the King of Spain	
Giorgi Mikhailovitch, Prince Shervashidze*	Russian Empire	4 March 1908	Comptroller of the Household of the Empress Marie Feódorovna of Russia	
Prince Gustav of Denmark*	Denmark	23 April 1908	Appointed on the occasion of the King's visit to Copenhagen	
Mogens, Count Krag Juel Vind-Frijs*	Denmark	23 April 1908	Chamberlain to the King of Denmark, attached to King Edward VII. Appointed on the occasion of the King's visit to Copenhagen	
Lieutenant-General Arnold Kühnel*	Denmark	23 April 1908	Commanding 1st District. Appointed on the occasion of the King's visit to Copenhagen	
Sir Alan Johnstone	United Kingdom	23 April 1908	His Majesty's Envoy Extraordinary and Minister Plenipotentary at Copenhagen. Appointed on the occasion of the King's visit to Copenhagen	
Rear-Admiral Arvid Lindman*	Sweden	27 April 1908	Prime Minister. Appointed on the occasion of the King's visit to Stockholm	
Eric Trolle*	Sweden	27 April 1908	Minister for Foreign Affairs. Appointed on the occasion of the King's visit to Stockholm	
Herman, Count Wrangel*	Sweden	27 April 1908	Envoy Extraordinary and Minister Plenipotentiary of the King of Sweden at the Court of St James'. Appointed on the occasion of the King's visit to Stockholm	
Fredrik, Baron von Essen*	Sweden	27 April 1908	Marshal of the Realm to the King of Sweden. Appointed on the occasion of the King's visit to Stockholm	
Carl Lilliehöök*	Sweden	27 April 1908	Master of the Household to the King of Sweden. Appointed on the occasion of the King's visit to Stockholm	
Albert, Count Stenbock*	Sweden	27 April 1908	Lord of the Bedchamber to the King of Sweden. Attached to King Edward VII. Appointed on the occasion of the King's visit to Stockholm	
Wilhelm Christophersen*	Norway	2 May 1908	Minister for Foreign Affairs. Appointed on the occasion of the King's visit to Stockholm	
Lieutenant-General Ole Hansen*	Norway	2 May 1908	Commander-in-Chief of the Norwegian Army. Attached to King Edward VII. Appointed on the occasion of the King's visit to Stockholm	
Sir Arthur Herbert	United Kingdom	2 May 1908	His Majesty's Envoy Extraordinary and Minister Plenipotentiary at Christiania. Appointed on the occasion of the King's visit to Stockholm	
Stéphen Pichon*	France	29 May 1908	Minister for Foreign Affairs. Appointed on the occasion of the President of the French Republic's visit to London	
Jean Lanes*	France	29 May 1908	Secretary-General to the President. Appointed on the occasion of the President of the French Republic's visit to London	
Armand Mollard*	France	29 May 1908	Minister Plenipotentiary and Director of the Protocol. Appointed on the occasion of the President of the French Republic's visit to London	
Vice-Admiral Horace Jauréguiberry*	France	29 May 1908	Commander-in-Chief of the French Northern Squadron. Appointed on the occasion of the President of the French Republic's visit to London	
Prince Peter Alexandrovich of Oldenburg*	Russian Empire	10 June 1908	Appointed on the occasion of the King's visit to Russia	
Pyotr Arkadyevich Stolypin*	Russian Empire	10 June 1908	President of the Council of Ministers. Appointed on the occasion of the King's visit to Russia	
General Baron Vladimir Fréedéricksz*	Russian Empire	10 June 1908	Minister of the Imperial Court. Appointed on the occasion of the King's visit to Russia	
Admiral Ivan Dikov*	Russian Empire	10 June 1908	Minister of Marine. Appointed on the occasion of the King's visit to Russia	
General Baron Alexander Zakamelsky*	Russian Empire	10 June 1908	Governor-General of the Baltic Provinces. Appointed on the occasion of the King's visit to Russia	
Admiral of the Fleet Sir John Fisher	United Kingdom	10 June 1908	First and Principal Naval Aide-de-Camp to the King. Appointed on the occasion of the King's visit to Russia	
Albert Grey, 4th Earl Grey	United Kingdom	23 July 1908	Governor General of Canada. Appointed on the occasion of the Prince of Wales's visit to Quebec	
Léon Geoffray*	France	27 July 1908	French Minister Plenipotentiary and Councillor of Embassy at the Court of St James's; appointed on his retirement from that post	
Martin, Baron von Jenisch*	German Empire	18 August 1908	Minister in attendance on the German Emperor, King of Prussia. Appointed on the occasion of the King's visit to Cronberg	
General Archduke Eugen of Austria*	Austria-Hungary	21 August 1908	Appointed on the occasion of the King's visit to Ischl	
Archduke Joseph August of Austria*	Austria-Hungary	21 August 1908	Appointed on the occasion of the King's visit to Ischl	
Captain Prince Georg of Bavaria*	German Empire	21 August 1908	Appointed on the occasion of the King's visit to Ischl	
Lieutenant Prince Konrad of Bavaria*	German Empire	21 August 1908	Appointed on the occasion of the King's visit to Ischl	
Erasmus, Baron von Handel*	Austria-Hungary	21 August 1908	Governor of Upper Austria. Appointed on the occasion of the King's visit to Ischl	
Francis von Schiessl Perstorff*	Austria-Hungary	21 August 1908	Chief of the Civil Cabinet of the Emperor of Austria, King of Hungary. Appointed on the occasion of the King's visit to Ischl	
Donald Smith, 1st Baron Strathcona and Mount Royal	United Kingdom	26 September 1908	Politician, businessman, diplomat and philanthropist. He had served as a member of parliament twice and the president of the Bank of Montreal; at the time of his appointment, he was governor of the Hudson's Bay Company and Canadian High Commissioner to the United Kingdom	
Edward Stanley, 17th Earl of Derby	United Kingdom	9 November 1908	Politician, diplomat and racehorse-owner, who had served as Postmaster General from 1903 to 1905	
Thomas Coke, Viscount Coke	United Kingdom	9 November 1908	Lord Lieutenant of Norfolk	
Count Tage Thott*	Sweden	17 November 1908	Premier Venuer de la Cour. Appointed on the occasion of the King and Queen of Sweden's visit to Windsor	
Rear-Admiral Wilhelm Dyrssen*	Sweden	17 November 1908	Inspecteur de la Flotte. Appointed on the occasion of the King and Queen of Sweden's visit to Windsor	
Sir Cecil Spring Rice	United Kingdom	17 November 1908	His Majesty's Envoy Extraordinary and Minister Plenipotentiary at Stockholm. Appointed on the occasion of the King and Queen of Sweden's visit to Windsor	
Prince Adalbert of Prussia*	German Empire	12 February 1909	Appointed on the occasion of the King's visit to Berlin	
General Karl von Bülow*	German Empire	12 February 1909	Commanding the 3rd Army Corps. Appointed on the occasion of the King's visit to Berlin	
Lieutenant-General Fritz von Below*	German Empire	12 February 1909	Commanding the 1st Division of the Guards. Appointed on the occasion of the King's visit to Berlin	
Lieutenant-General Dedo von Schenck*	German Empire	12 February 1909	Commanding the 2nd Division of the Guards. Appointed on the occasion of the King's visit to Berlin	
Vice-Admiral Guido von Usedom*	German Empire	12 February 1909	(Imperial German Navy). Attached to King Edward VII. Appointed on the occasion of the King's visit to Berlin	
Lieutenant-General Sir Henry Grant	United Kingdom	24 April 1909	Governor and Commander-in-Chief, Malta. Appointed on the occasion of the King's visit to Malta	
Sir George Buchanan	United Kingdom	3 June 1909	His Majesty's Envoy Extraordinary and Minister Plenipotentiary to the Queen of the Netherlands, and also to the Grand Duke of Luxembourg	
Prince Morimasa Nashimoto of Japan*	Japan	7 June 1909	Member of the Japanese imperial family	
James Gascoyne-Cecil, 4th Marquess of Salisbury	United Kingdom	12 June 1909	Colonel, Commanding 4th Battalion, The Bedfordshire Regiment, Aide-de-Camp to the King	
Ismail Loufti Bey*	Ottoman Empire	22 June 1909	Chamberlain to the Sultan of Turkey	
General Al-Farouki Samy Pasha*	Ottoman Empire	22 June 1909	Senator, Turkey	
Admiral Sir Assheton Curzon-Howe	United Kingdom	12 July 1909	Commander-in-Chief, Mediterranean	
Prince Christopher of Greece and Denmark*	Greece	13 July 1909	Youngest son of King George I of Greece	
Prince George of Greece (later George II of Greece)*	Greece	20 July 1909	Son of the Duke of Sparta, and Grandson of the King of the Hellenes. Appointed on the occasion of the anniversary of his Birthday	
Prince Kuni Kuniyoshi of Japan*	Japan	21 July 1909	Member of the Japanese imperial family	
Admiral Sir Arthur Dalrymple Fanshawe	United Kingdom	31 July 1909	Commander-in-Chief, Portsmouth. Appointed on the occasion of the review of the Fleet by the King in the Solent	
Admiral Sir William May	United Kingdom	31 July 1909	Commander-in-Chief, Home Fleet. Appointed on the occasion of the review of the Fleet by the King in the Solent	
Lieutenant-General Constantin, Prince Bélosselsky-Bélozersky*	Russian Empire	5 August 1909	General Aide-de-Camp to the Emperor of Russia. Appointed on the occasion of the Emperor and Empress of Russia's visit	
Count Vassili Alexandrovich Hendrikov*	Russian Empire	5 August 1909	Grand Master of the Ceremonies in attendance on the Empress of Russia. Appointed on the occasion of the Emperor and Empress of Russia's visit.	
Sir Fairfax Leighton Cartwright	United Kingdom	3 September 1909	His Majesty's Ambassador Extraordinary and Plenipotentiary, Vienna. Appointed on the occasion of the King's visit to Marienbad	
Francis Charteris, 10th Earl of Wemyss and March	United Kingdom	9 November 1909	Aide-de-Camp to the King	
Carlos du Bocage*	Portugal	16 November 1909	Minister for Foreign Affairs, Portugal. Appointed on the occasion of the King of Portugal's visit to Windsor	
Antonio Cezar e Menezes, Count of Sabugosa*	Portugal	16 November 1909	Lord Steward to the King of Portugal. Appointed on the occasion of the King of Portugal's visit to Windsor	
Luiz Coutinho Borges de Medeiros, Marquess of Fayal*	Portugal	16 November 1909	Lord-in-Waiting to the King of Portugal. Appointed on the occasion of the King of Portugal's visit to Windsor	
Dom José d'Almeida Corrêa de Sá, 6th Marquess of Lavradio*	Portugal	16 November 1909	Private Secretary to the King of Portugal. Appointed on the occasion of the King of Portugal's visit to Windsor	
Sir Francis Villiers	United Kingdom	16 November 1909	His Majesty's Envoy Extraordinary and Minister Plenipotentiary, Lisbon. Appointed on the occasion of the King of Portugal's visit to Windsor	
Lord Li Jingfang*	China	20 November 1909	Envoy Extraordinary and Minister Plenipotentiary of the Emperor of China at the Court of St James's	
Major Prince Francis of Teck	United Kingdom	1 December 1909	Officer in the Reserves and a younger brother of Queen Mary, wife of King George V	
Fredrick Oliver Robinson, 2nd Marquess of Ripon	United Kingdom	1 December 1909	Treasurer to Queen Alexandra	
Jean, Count d'Oultremont*	Belgium	22 December 1909	Master of the Household to the King of the Belgians. Appointed on the occasion of the Duke of Connaught's visit to Brussels (to represent the King at the Funeral of the King of the Belgians)	
Lieutenant-General Harry Jungbluth*	Belgium	22 December 1909	Aide-de-Camp to the King of the Belgians. Attached to the Duke of Connaught. Appointed on the occasion of the Duke of Connaught's visit to Brussels (to represent the King at the Funeral of the King of the Belgians)	
Edward Guinness, 1st Viscount Iveagh	United Kingdom	7 January 1910	Appointed on the occasion of the King's visit to Elveden	
Prince Fushimi Hiroyasu of Japan*	Japan	25 January 1910	Member of the Japanese imperial family	
Louis Eugene, 9th Prince of Ligne*	Belgium	25 January 1910	Special Ambassador from King Albert of Belgium	
Johannes Irgens*	Norway	25 February 1910	Late Envoy Extraordinary and Minister Plenipotentiary of the King of Norway at the Court of St James's	

== See also ==
- List of knights grand cross of the Royal Victorian Order appointed by Victoria
