= Waldemar Tully Oxholm =

Danish courtier and diplomat (1805–1876)

His Excellency, General Waldemar Tully von Oxholm R.E. St.K.D.
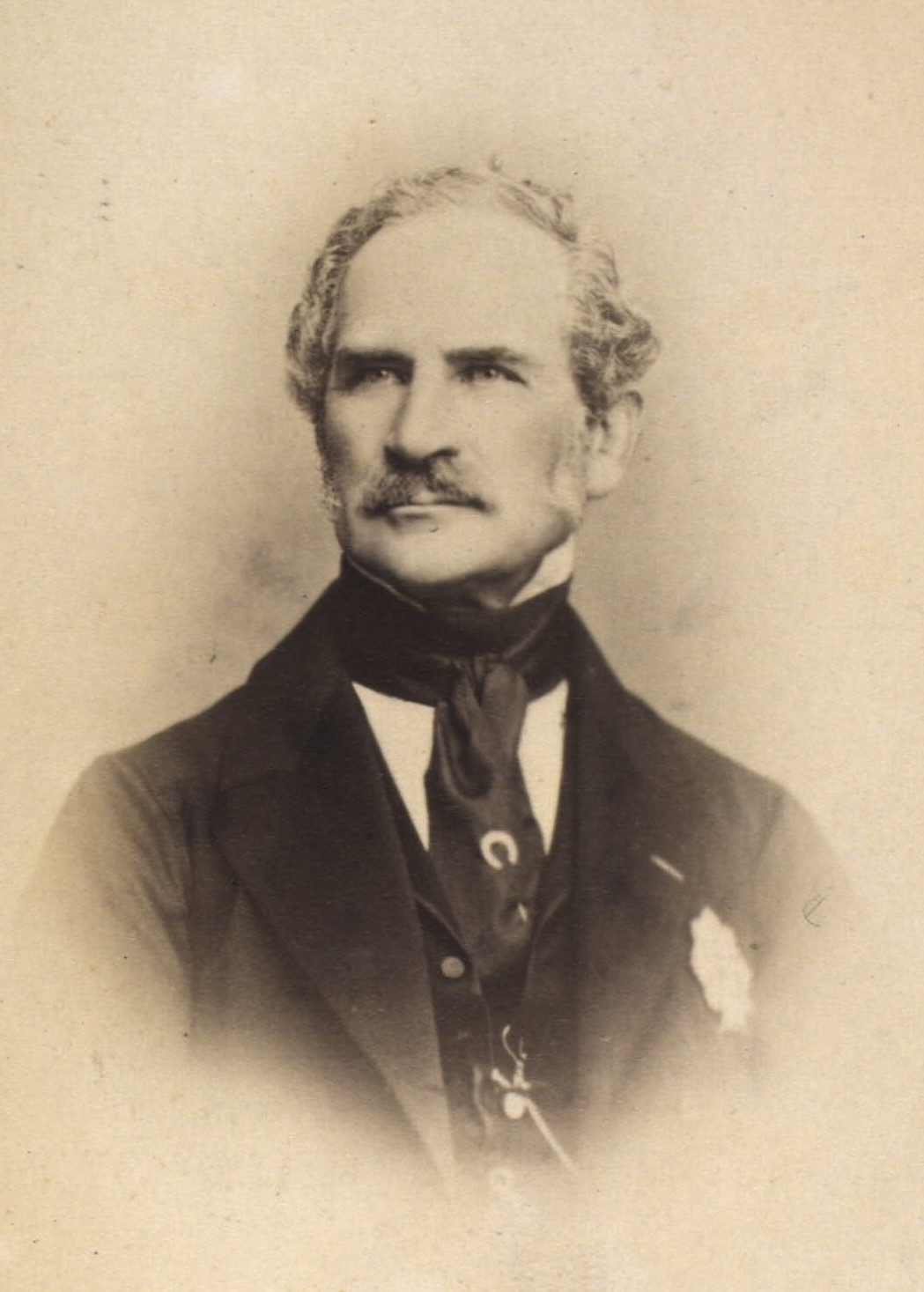
- Oxholm, photographed by Georg Emil Hansen

Lord Marshal of the Court of Denmark
- In office November 1863 – 3 August 1876
- Monarch: Christian IX
- Preceded by: Carl Ludvig Løvenskiold
- Succeeded by: Oscar S. O'Neill Oxholm

Lord Chamberlain of Denmark
- In office 1867 – 3 August 1876
- Monarch: Christian IX
- Preceded by: Count Christian C. S. Danneskiold-Samsøe
- Succeeded by: Count Ludvig Holstein-Holsteinborg

Envoy Extraordinary and Minister Plenipotentiary of Denmark to the United Kingdom
- In office 1854–1857
- Monarch: Frederick VII
- Preceded by: Christian Høyer Bille
- Succeeded by: Carl Edvard van Dockum

King-appointed member of the Danish Constituent Assembly
- In office 1848–1849

King-appointed member of the Landsting
- In office 1849–1853
- Constituency: 6th constituency, Funen

Personal details
- Born: 11 November 1805 Copenhagen, Denmark–Norway
- Died: 3 August 1876 (aged 70) Smidstrup, Vedbæk, Denmark
- Education: Herlufsholm School; University of Copenhagen

Waldemar Tully (von) Oxholm (11 November 1805 – 3 August 1876) was a Danish nobleman, diplomat, and senior court official. He served as Lord Marshal of the Court under Christian IX from 1863 until his death, and although never in executive office, he is regarded as an influential intermediary in Denmark's transition from absolutism to constitutional monarchy, particularly during the political crises of 1848 and 1863.

Born in Copenhagen, the son of Governor-General Peter Lotharius Oxholm and Ann O’Neill, he was educated at Herlufsholm School and the University of Copenhagen. He joined the Foot Guards in 1821 and spent the following decade in the Danish West Indies, where he assisted in managing his family's plantations on Saint Croix and served as adjutant to Governor-General Peter von Scholten. Returning to Copenhagen in 1834, he assisted Scholten in government deliberations on the abolition of slavery, and was that year appointed tutor to Prince Christian of Glücksburg (later Christian IX), whom he accompanied to the University of Bonn, where a lifelong relationship of trust was established.

After his return to Denmark, Oxholm entered court service as chamberlain (1840) and later chief of the Crown Prince Frederick's household (1842–1847). During the March Revolution of 1848 he mediated between King Frederick VII, Count Adam Wilhelm Moltke, and the National Liberal leaders in forming the March Ministry, subsequently sitting in the Danish Constituent Assembly (1848–1849) and the Landsting (1849–1853). At the outset of the First Schleswig War, he was sent on diplomatic missions to St Petersburg, Stockholm, and London, and served as Danish minister to Britain from 1854 to 1857.

In 1863 Oxholm accompanied Prince Christian and Princess Louise to London for the marriage of Princess Alexandra to the Prince of Wales, where he transmitted the British proposal that Prince William of Denmark should be elected King of Greece. Following Christian IX's accession in November 1863, Oxholm was appointed Lord Marshal of the Court (Danish: overhofmarskal), becoming chief officer of the royal household and principal adviser to the new king. During the constitutional crisis of December 1863, when the recently enacted November Constitution provoked international opposition and the threat of war with Prussia and Austria, he coordinated communication between the crown and the government. Regarded by the National Liberals with suspicion but respected in conservative circles for his loyalty and integrity, he remained one of Christian IX's most trusted advisers until his death at Smidstrup near Vedbæk, aged 70, on 3 August 1876.

== Early life and education ==
Waldemar (Valdemar) Tully Oxholm was born on 11 November 1805 in Copenhagen, the son of Peter Lotharius Oxholm, later lieutenant general, governor-general of the Danish West Indies, and proprietor of extensive plantations on Saint Croix, and of his second wife Ann O’Neill, daughter of a plantation owner on St. Croix.

After private tuition, he entered the classical school at Herlufsholm aged 11, and was matriculated to the University of Copenhagen in 1820. The following year he passed the examen philosophicum, passed an officer's examination, and received a commission as second lieutenant à la suite in the Foot Guards. By 1824 he held the court rank of kammerjunker (gentleman of the bedchamber).

Family obligations soon led him overseas. In 1822, he obtained leave from the army to assist his father in the management of his extensive plantations on Saint Croix. Although he periodically returned to Denmark for military duty, the following decade was largely spent between Copenhagen and the Danish West Indies, alternating service at court and in colonial administration.

== Colonial service in the Danish West Indies (1822–1834) ==
Following his father's death in 1827, Oxholm returned to Saint Croix to oversee the family estates, together with his elder brother Frederik Thomas (“Fritz”) Oxholm. Their combined holdings amounted to about 750 acres, and the brothers succeeded in restoring their profitability after years of financial strain. At that time, the Oxholm brothers owned the plantations ‘Mountain’, 'Mint' and ‘Envy’ in the Prince's Quarter. Both maintained a close working relationship with Governor-General Peter von Scholten, who became their father's successor and later patron. He embarked at Falmouth on the Danish brig St. Jan at the end of May 1827 and reached the islands on 8 July.

That same year, von Scholten appointed Waldemar Oxholm his adjutant, a position that made him one of the Governor-General's principal aides. Oxholm accompanied von Scholten on official voyages through the Caribbean and to North America. In the summer of 1830, Oxholm travelled with von Scholten to the United States, then continued independently to Canada, journeying across Lake Ontario and visiting Niagara Falls before rejoining von Scholten in New York City. During this period, reports reached them of the July Revolution in France, which provoked widespread excitement in the US and was soon commemorated with public celebrations in major American cities. Staying in the US, they travelled to Washington, D.C. in October 1830, where they conducted a diplomatic mission and met with President Andrew Jackson, discussing commercial relations and maritime issues.

His duties also included dispatches to Spanish territories (notably Puerto Rico) and to the Venezuelan littoral, and courier service among the Danish islands. Between 1830 and 1834 Oxholm travelled repeatedly between Europe and the West Indies, sometimes recalled for reasons of health but consistently reappointed to the Governor-General's staff. He was active in the negotiations over the legal status of the free people of colour (Danish: frikulørte).

Returning to Europe with Governor-General Peter von Scholten in the spring of 1834, Oxholm arrived at Copenhagen in August and was tasked with assisting Scholten in the ongoing governmental consultations on the future of the colonial slave system in the Danish West Indies. The assignment was given in recognition of Oxholm's previously demonstrated interest in West Indian questions, and he remained engaged in the work until the consultations concluded in November that year. During this period he continued to travel between Europe and the Caribbean. On 21 October 1834 he was appointed a Knight of the Order of the Dannebrog, and was subsequently promoted to captain in the Life Guards. The following decade saw him drawn further into the royal household and diplomatic life. Also in 1834, he was appointed government councillor (Danish: regeringsråd).

== Early court service ==
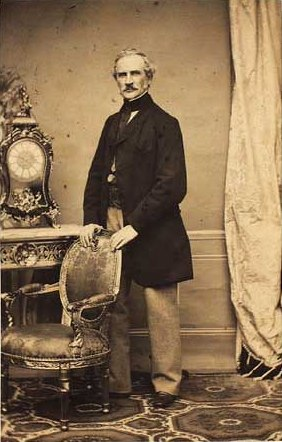
Photograph by Georg Emil Hansen.

=== Tutor to Prince Christian of Glücksburg ===
In 1834, Frederik VI appointed Oxholm tutor-governor (Danish: guvernør) to the young Prince Christian of Glücksburg (the future King Christian IX) and to Prince Frederick of Hesse (nephew of Frederick VI), son of Landgrave Wilhelm of Hesse and Louise Charlotte of Denmark. The appointment commended Oxholm as “a prudent and intelligent man of pure conduct,” suited to guide the princes “in learning to know the world, in mastering the true economy, and in employing their time in a manner appropriate to their station". His task was both educational and moral. Oxholm was instructed to accompany the princes on their travels, first to Louisenlund Castle in Schleswig, then to Hanover to meet with King Ernest Augustus, and finally to Bonn, where they attended lectures at the University for roughly two years. The programme of instruction emphasised natural law, modern history, French, and English, alongside regular lectures and practical exercises in household economy and bookkeeping. He was to report weekly to the king, submit monthly accounts, and ensure that the princes maintained “right principles in religion,” regular study habits, and the manners expected of their rank.

During the princes’ residence abroad, a close, trusting and enduring friendship developed between Oxholm and Prince Christian. The sojourn is generally regarded as the beginning of the close and lasting relationship between Oxholm and the future King Christian IX, and would later prove of great significance to both men.

=== Service to the crown prince and central administration ===
Upon the princes’ return, Oxholm entered service in the central administration. In 1841, he was appointed as commissioner in the General Customs Chamber (Danish: Generaltoldkammeret) “with the West Indian cases to hand". Christian VIII wrote to von Scholten on this occasion: "With him, one can be sure of knowledge and integrity". He was given concurrent placement à la suite as major in recognition of his military seniority.

He helped organise Frederik's 1841 marriage to Duchess Caroline Mariane of Mecklenburg. From 1842 to 1847 he served as Lord Chamberlain of the Household (Danish: hofchef) to the crown prince, Frederik (later Frederik VII), administering the prince's household, coordinating ceremonial and travel, and acting as a principal liaison between the heir apparent and the ministries. He held this position for five years, but resigned in 1847 in protest at the crown prince's liaison with Louise Rasmussen, later Countess Danner. The rupture, however, was not permanent, and following his accession in 1848, Frederik VII again turned to Oxholm for advice in forming his first constitutional government.

=== Ennoblement ===
In 1839 von Scholten recommended to King Christian VIII that the Oxholm siblings be admitted to the Danish nobility. This occurred in 1840, when the family was ennobled, in recognition of the family's contribution to the recovery of the West Indian colonies and their own conduct in local administration. Von Scholten's petition described their father's “great service to the islands after the occupation” and attested “in the strongest terms to the brothers’ character and bearing”. The ennoblement occurred by resolution of 11 February 1840 and patent of 24 June of the same year. As newer members of the aristocracy, the Oxholm family formed part of the lesser nobility (gentry).

== 1848 revolution and legislative career (1848–1853) ==
=== March days and the formation of the March Ministry ===
In early 1848 Denmark stood at the intersection of European upheaval and a domestic constitutional crisis. The February Revolution in Paris and tumults in Vienna and Berlin emboldened Denmark's National Liberals, whose programme called for a responsible ministry, a free and democratic constitution, and an Eider policy integrating Schleswig with the kingdom. Simultaneously, a counter-movement in the duchies, centred in Kiel, pressed for Schleswig–Holstein’s alignment with the German Confederation, raising the spectre of civil war and foreign intervention. Following Christian VIII’s death (20 January 1848), the new king Frederik VII confronted mass petitions and demonstrations in Copenhagen demanding constitutional government.

Against this backdrop the court again drew Oxholm into the centre of affairs. Despite his 1847 break with the crown prince’s household, he was summoned for counsel. He urged Frederik VII to "send for the people’s leaders", i.e. to bring leading National Liberals into office alongside established officials. Acting as intermediary between the king, Moltke, and figures such as Peter Georg Bang, Orla Lehmann, and Anton Frederik Tscherning, he helped secure agreement on the formation of the March Ministry, a coalition under Count Adam Wilhelm Moltke tasked with averting escalation in the duchies, initiating constitutional reforms, and steering the monarchy from absolutism toward parliamentary rule. In his memoirs, Orla Lehmann later recalled that Christian IX and Count Molke heavily considered appointing Oxholm as Minister of Foreign Affairs, in the first cabinet of Moltke. However, Oxholm declined office for himself, and proposed C. E. Zahrtmann for the Navy (ultimately serving only in a secretarial capacity while Moltke held the portfolio). The First Schleswig War followed within weeks, whereupon he was dispatched on sensitive diplomatic missions.

=== Diplomatic missions ===
In late March 1848 he was dispatched to St Petersburg to solicit Russian adherence to a policy of non-intervention. He returned to the Russian court in June to soothe imperial anger after the fighting on Sundeved. In Stockholm he assisted at the negotiation of the Dano–Swedish-Norwegian military convention for an auxiliary corps, and in August 1848 he took part in the talks that produced the Armistice of Malmö. Early in 1849 he participated in the ultimately fruitless London peace deliberations. For his services he received brevet rank as general major (1848).

=== Constituent Assembly and the Landsting ===
Oxholm also entered public life as a legislator. In 1848, he was selected by Frederick VII to serve as a king-appointed member of the Danish Constituent Assembly (1848–49). He was one of the 15 noblemen members of the assembly. He was characterized as politically conservative to moderately liberal (Danish: "lidt liberal"). Oxholm wielded considerable influence as the king's confidant, however he was absent during the final vote of the draft constitution.

He then represented Funen in the Landsting (1849–53), the upper chamber of Rigsdagen. Politically he inclined to a conservative whole-state (Helstat) position and, in foreign affairs, argued that Denmark should anchor itself to Russia, a stance that would soon complicate his diplomatic work.

== Envoy to the United Kingdom ==
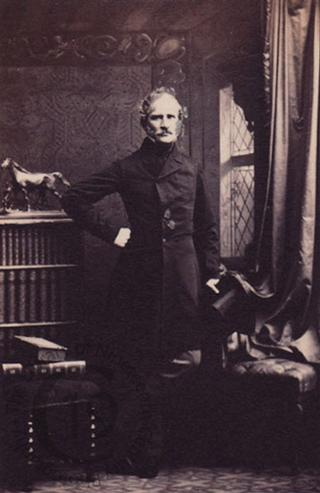
The carte-de-visite portrait of Oxholm, taken on the occasion of the marriage of Princess Alexandra and the Prince of Wales, 1863.

In January 1854, Oxholm was appointed Envoy Extraordinary and Minister Plenipotentiary to the Court of St James's. Oxholm thereby became Denmark's chief representative in London at the outset of the Crimean War, when Copenhagen sought to preserve strict neutrality while balancing relations with Britain and Russia. His posting fell under Foreign Minister Ludvig Nicolaus von Scheele (1855–1857) and was complicated by Oxholm's long-standing inclination to anchor Danish policy to Russia, a stance increasingly awkward in wartime London.

Throughout 1854 to 1856 he handled routine legation business and the political weather of a belligerent capital, but by mid-1856, after protracted strain and several periods of leave, he requested formal release of his duties. The request was accepted at year's end, and Denmark exchanged formal letters of recall in early 1857; Oxholm was succeeded in the London legation by Alfred Reventlow-Criminil (interim, 1856) and, after a short interregnum, by Carl Edvard van Dockum (1858–1860).

=== London visit and the Greek succession ===
In the years following his resignation from the diplomatic service, Oxholm resided chiefly at his estate Tårnborg near Korsør, which he had acquired in 1845. He took a limited part in national politics, standing unsuccessfully for election to the Rigsdag in 1859 and 1861, but continued to cultivate close personal ties with the royal family, particularly with Prince Christian of Glücksburg, the future Christian IX.

In March 1863, Oxholm accompanied Prince Christian and Princess Louise to Windsor, where their daughter Princess Alexandra was married to the Prince of Wales (the future Edward VII). During this stay in London, Prime Minister Lord Palmerston, acting through Foreign Secretary Lord John Russell, approached Oxholm as an intermediary to establish contact with Prince Christian regarding the possible election of his younger son, Prince William of Denmark, to the Greek throne. Oxholm promptly transmitted the proposal to Copenhagen, ensuring that the Danish government was formally informed of the British démarche, a matter that shortly thereafter culminated in William's accession as King George I of Greece.

A carte-de-visite was taken of him and his wife by Camille Silvy, when they participated as part of Alexandra's retinue in the wedding to Prince Edward. Arriving aboard the royal yacht at Gravesend on 7 March 1863, they were a part of the bride's procession at her wedding in St George's Chapel at Windsor on 10 March 1863.

== Court marshal to Christian IX (1863–1876) ==
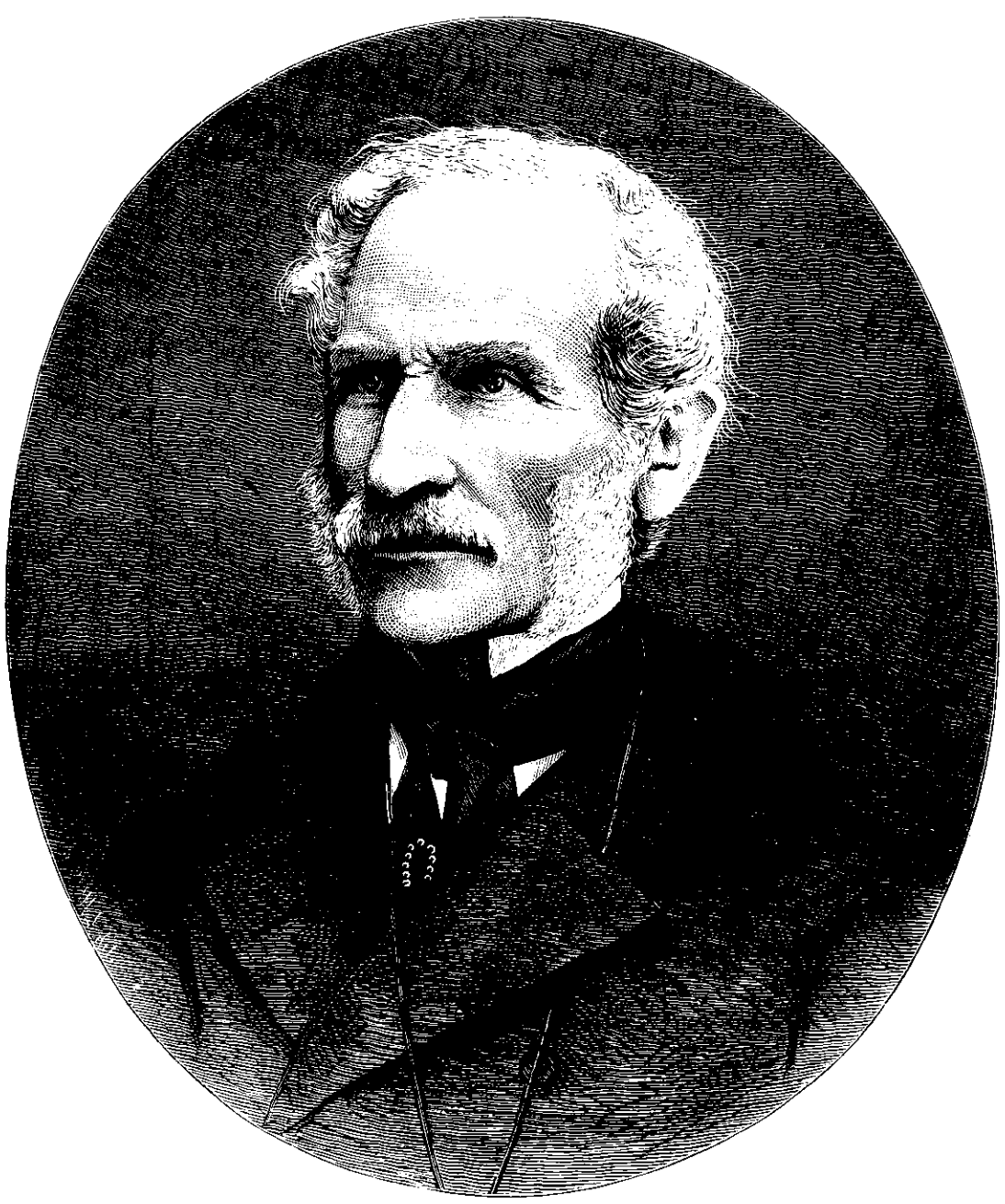
W. Oxholm, wood-engraving in his obituary in Illustreret Tidende, 1876.

=== December 1863 constitutional crisis ===
Following the accession of King Christian IX in November 1863, Oxholm was appointed Lord Marshal of the Court (Danish: Overhofmarskal), becoming the highest-ranking court official and the monarch's principal intermediary in both ceremonial and political matters. He simultaneously retained the office of Master of Ceremonies (Danish: ordensceremonimester) until 1867, overseeing court protocol, precedence, and investitures.

The new position opened under conditions of acute constitutional and diplomatic tension. The government of Carl Christian Hall had, on 18 November 1863, enacted the November Constitution, uniting Denmark and Schleswig under a common framework that violated the guarantees of the London Protocol of 1852. The resulting opposition from Prussia and Austria brought the monarchy to the brink of war and placed the inexperienced Christian IX in a position of extraordinary difficulty.

Contemporary notes by Privy Councillor C. N. David record Oxholm's direct involvement in the events of 25 December 1863, when the King resolved to convene the Rigsråd to consider suspending the Constitution before it entered into force. David reports that Christian IX stated that “General Oxholm” had offered, on an interim basis, to assemble a new ministry should the existing government refuse to act. Oxholm then oversaw the practical arrangements for summoning councillors to an extended Council of State that evening and ensured that David was instructed to prepare the opening address.

=== Court finance, ceremonial, and influence ===
In the years following the Second Schleswig War (1864), Oxholm continued to exercise influence at court, particularly in questions of ceremonial and royal finance. David's later recollections portray him as a consistent defender of the dignity and outward prestige of the monarchy. Oxholm opposed proposals to abolish the Royal Horse Guards, advocated a civil list comparable to that of Frederik VII, and insisted on adequate resources for the maintenance of Amalienborg Palace and other royal residences. He is quoted as saying that “what is necessary for the royal dignity, money must be found for”. These views made him a controversial figure: the National Liberals regarded him with distrust and saw him as a conservative bulwark within the royal household, while in conservative circles he was esteemed for his personal courtesy, affable manner, and pronounced sense of rectitude.

In 1866, he accompanied the eighteen-year-old Princess Dagmar of Denmark on her journey to Russia for her marriage to the heir to the Russian throne, the future Emperor Alexander III. In her diary Dagmar described the anguish of parting from her parents and affectionately noted Oxholm's kindness: “The good Oxholm, to distract me a little, bought me a parrot, knowing that I had always wished for one”.

His proximity to the King and his role in mediating between the crown and successive governments made Oxholm one of the defining personalities of the early Glücksburg court. Although he held no ministerial office, his influence was felt in the formation of policy and the preservation of royal authority during a period of national defeat, political reorganisation, and financial constraint.

In 1867, in the 25th wedding anniversary honours of Christian IX and Queen Louise, Oxholm was given the title Lord Chamberlain (Danish: overkammerherre), the historically supreme officer of the Royal Household of Denmark. He was made a Knight of the Order of the Elephant in 1869.

== Landowner ==
=== Tårnborg and Kruusesminde ===
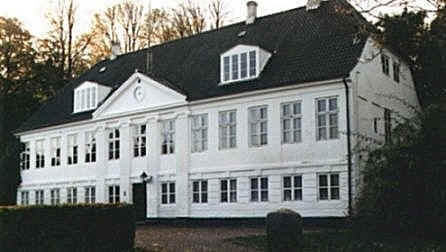
Tårnborg near Korsør, which Oxholm bought in 1845.

In 1845, Oxholm purchased Dyrehovedgård on the Halskov peninsula by Korsør and in 1846 renamed the seat Tårnborg. During the 1850s he also acquired the neighbouring estate Kruusesminde, becoming one of the largest landholders in western Zealand. A prolonged dispute with the town of Korsør over traditional grazing rights on the Halskov Common ended with a royal licence of 1 November 1859 allowing Oxholm to summon rival claimants. When none appeared, the local court on 4 March 1861 awarded him ownership of about 203 barrels of land (roughly 100 hectares) to be his property, which he incorporated into the Kruusesminde estate.

Building on drainage works begun by Ferdinand Ree, Oxholm carried out extensive land reclamation of the low-lying meadows around Tårnborg. Completed by 1865, the project added about 260–317 barrels of arable land and significantly improved the estate's productivity. During the planning of the Zealand main railway to Korsør, Oxholm successfully advocated routing the line north of the nor, across his own land. The decision increased the value and accessibility of Tårnborg. In 1866 Oxholm sold Tårnborg and Kruusesminde to Jørgen Albert Bech.

=== Smidstrupgård (Smidstrup Castle) ===
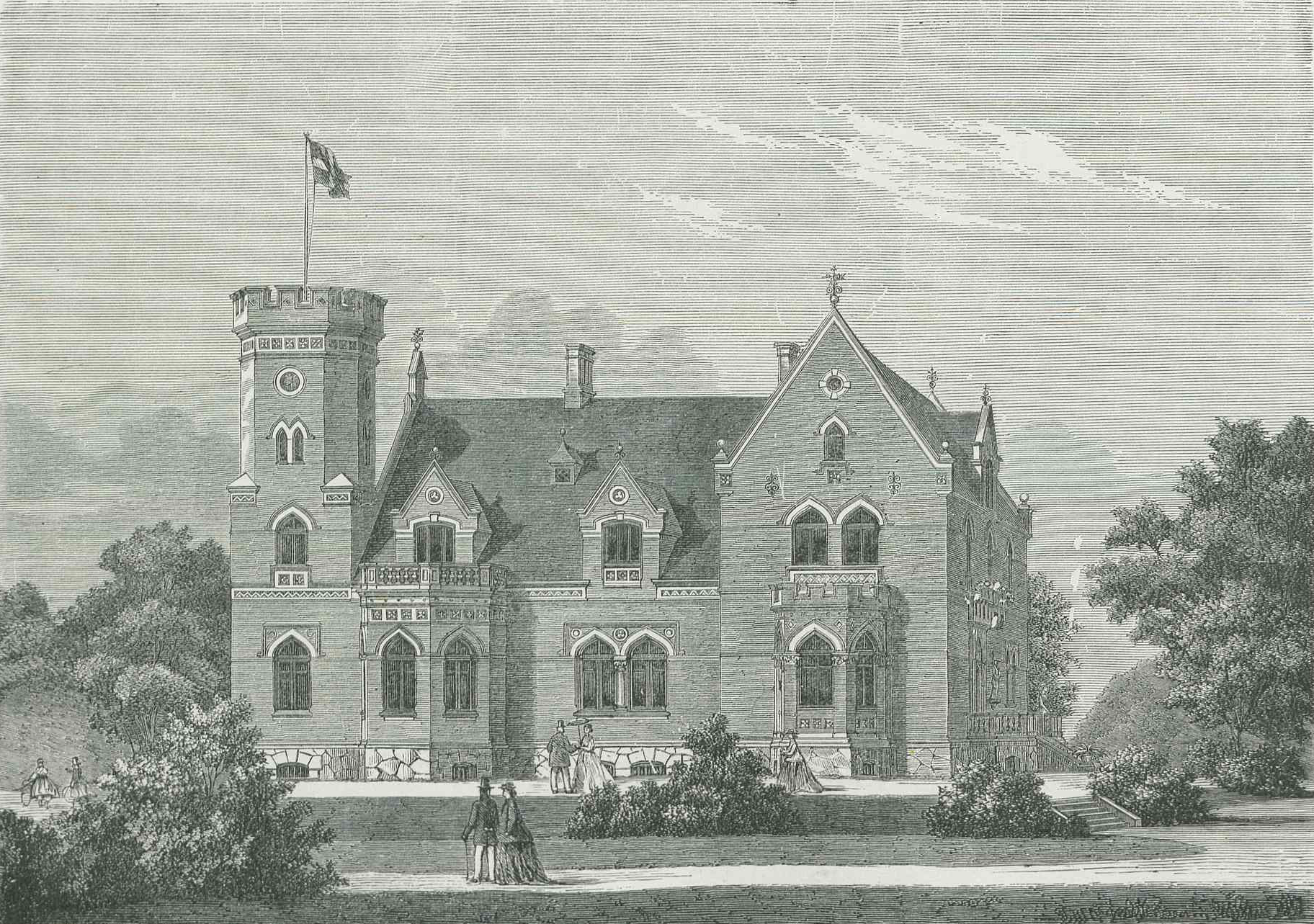
Smidstrup Castle on the Vedbæk estate Oxholm acquired in 1866

In 1866, Oxholm acquired the estate of Smidstrupgård near Vedbæk and commissioned the construction of a new main building, known as Smidstrup Castle, designed by architect C. V. Nielsen in a restrained neo-Gothic style. The estate lay outside the protected area surrounding Henriksholm and formed part of a traditional agricultural property.

After Oxholm's death, Smidstrupgård was purchased in 1888 by George I of Greece, who owned it until 1911 and used it as a summer residence during visits to Denmark, when he did not reside at Bernstorff Palace. The manor house fell into disrepair during the mid-twentieth century and was demolished in 1969–1970; its parkland was subsequently subdivided for residential development.

== Personal life ==
=== Marriages ===
Oxholm married twice. On 29 May 1841, in Hannover, he married Anna von Rudloff (1821–1841), daughter of the Hanoverian legation councillor and general post director Wilhelm August von Rudloff and Henriette Sophie von Scheele. She died only a few months after their wedding.

He married secondly on 29 October 1846 at Sorgenfri Palace, Marie Sophie Frederikke von Krogh (1815–1899), daughter of (then) Captain, later Lieutenant General Gerhard Christoph von Krogh and Countess Siegfriede Victorine Knuth. According to contemporary accounts, their engagement originated from a social misunderstanding: during a severe winter storm, Oxholm assisted the young lady into his carriage as she arrived for an audience at Amalienborg, mistaking her for another courtier. The incident developed into an acquaintance that soon led to marriage. The marriages produced no issue.

=== Death and funeral ===
In his later years Oxholm suffered from a progressively debilitating heart condition. On medical advice he undertook annual spa and health journeys abroad in an effort to restore his declining strength, but these brought little improvement. By mid-1875 he had largely withdrawn from official duties, though he continued to involve himself occasionally in matters of importance to the royal household.

Oxholm died on 3 August 1876, aged 70, at his residence of Smidstrup Castle between Vedbæk and Rungsted, where he had lived since 1867.

== Legacy and character ==
Contemporary assessments of Oxholm were mixed. Admirers in conservative circles emphasised his personal affability and rectitude and his value as Overhofmarskal and confidant of Christian IX, while opponents among the National Liberals suspected his influence and sometimes styled him the king's “evil spirit” (Danish: Kongens onde Aand). He was thus regarded, despite never holding executive office, as a significant political presence from 1848 to his death.

In 1833 Admiral C. E. Zahrtmann, who had served with him on West Indian voyages, noted in Oxholm “on the whole a very gentlemanly calmness”. The king's cabinet secretary J. P. Trap later described him as “a very handsome man of agreeable ease in society and constant good will,” but added that “as a practical man he was somewhat restless, with shifting ideas, which could make him difficult to serve under, although his good nature on the other hand must have eased relations.” By contrast, general adjutant Heinrich Kauffmann judged him more critically during the run-up to the 1864 war, calling Oxholm the king's “closest adviser, surely loyally devoted to him, but quite devoid of statesmanlike tact and sure judgment in the dangerous situation”.

== Honours ==
=== Denmark ===
- (Denmark) Order of the Elephant: Knight (28 July 1869)
- (Denmark) Order of the Dannebrog:
  - Knight (21 October 1834)
  - Commander (6 October 1844)
  - Cross of Honour (Dannebrogsmændenes Hæderstegn) (28 June 1847)
  - Grand Cross (11 August 1848)

=== Foreign orders and decorations ===
- Sweden-Norway:
  - Order of the Seraphim: Knight
  - Order of the Sword: Commander Grand Cross, with brilliants
  - Order of St. Olav: Grand Cross
- Greece:
  - Order of the Redeemer: Grand Cross
- Portugal:
  - Order of Aviz: Grand Cross
- Tunisia:
  - Nichan Iftikhar: 1st Class
- Russian Empire:
  - Order of St. Alexander Nevsky
  - Order of the White Eagle (Russian Empire)
  - Order of St. Anna: 1st Class, with brilliants
  - Order of St. Vladimir: 4th Class
