= Marshal of the Court =

Marshal of the Court may refer to:

- Court Marshal of Denmark
- Hofmarschall (Court Marshal), in German princely courts
- Marshal of the Court of Lithuania
- Marshal of the Court (Serbia, Yugoslavia)
- Marshal of the Court (Sweden)
- Marshal of the United States Supreme Court
- Marszałek, royal official in the Polish-Lithuanian court

== See also ==
- Court Martial (disambiguation)
- Marshalsea Court, England
