= Court Martial (disambiguation) =

A court-martial is a military court that determines punishments for members of the military subject to military law.

Court Martial may also refer to:

- Drumhead court-martial, a trial held in the field to hear urgent charges.
- Court Martial (horse), a British Thoroughbred racehorse
- "Court Martial" (Star Trek: The Original Series), an episode of Star Trek: The Original Series
- "Court Martial" (UFO), an episode of UFO
- Court Martial (TV series), an ITC Entertainment and Roncom Productions co-production crime drama TV series that premiered in 1966
- Court Martial (1928 film), a 1928 film directed by George B. Seitz
- Court Martial (1959 film), a 1959 German film
- Court Martial (1978 film), a 1978 Yugoslav film
- Court Martial (2020 film), a 2020 Indian film
- Court Martial (play), a 1991 play written by Swadesh Deepak and directed by Arvind Gaur, basis for the films Shaurya (2008) and Melvilasom (2011)

== See also ==
- Marshal of the Court (disambiguation)
