= Hofmarschall =

German court title

The Hofmarschall (plural: Hofmarschälle) was the administrative official in charge of a princely German court, supervising all its economic affairs.

Historically, every civil service was regarded as court service (e.g. the Russian nobility is even now called the Dvoryanstvo, i.e. courtiers), though today high officials in the royal courts that still exist frequently use titles like marshal, chancellor or minister, which in other countries are now only used by the civil administration or the military. A Hofmarschall always belonged to the nobility or was a retired high-ranking military officers of major general rank or above.

A Hofmarschall's duties included organizing the king and the queen's receptions, foreign trips and state visits and supervising the royal household. He organized the whole court household, maintenance of the royal castles, and the provision of food and drink for the princely table, kitchens and wine-cellars. In larger courts the office of Hofmarschall were headed by an Oberhofmarschall, who was usually supported by a Hofmarschall and a Hausmarschall.

In Germany there was a Hofmarschall of the former House of Hohenzollern right up to 1945, as the uppermost official of the domestic ministry—he was based in the Dutch Palais (Niederländisches Palais) on the boulevard Unter den Linden in Berlin and administered the fortune of the Prussian royal household.

In Denmark (hofmarskal), Sweden (hovmarskalk), Norway (hoffmarskalk), the Netherlands ("hofmaarschalk") and in Luxembourg (maréchal de la cour), the rank of Hofmarschall still exists. It existed in Belgium until 2006.

Roughly corresponding offices in the United Kingdom are those of a Chamberlain, including Lord Great Chamberlain, Lord Steward of the Household and Lord Chamberlain of the Household.

== See also ==
- Marshal
- Marshal of the Court (disambiguation)
- Majordomo
