= Admissionales =

In ancient Rome, admissionales were chamberlains at the imperial court who introduced persons to the presence of the emperor. They were divided into four classes; the chief officer of each class was called proximus admissionum. The admissionales were usually freedmen.
