= List of knights grand cross of the Royal Victorian Order appointed by Victoria =

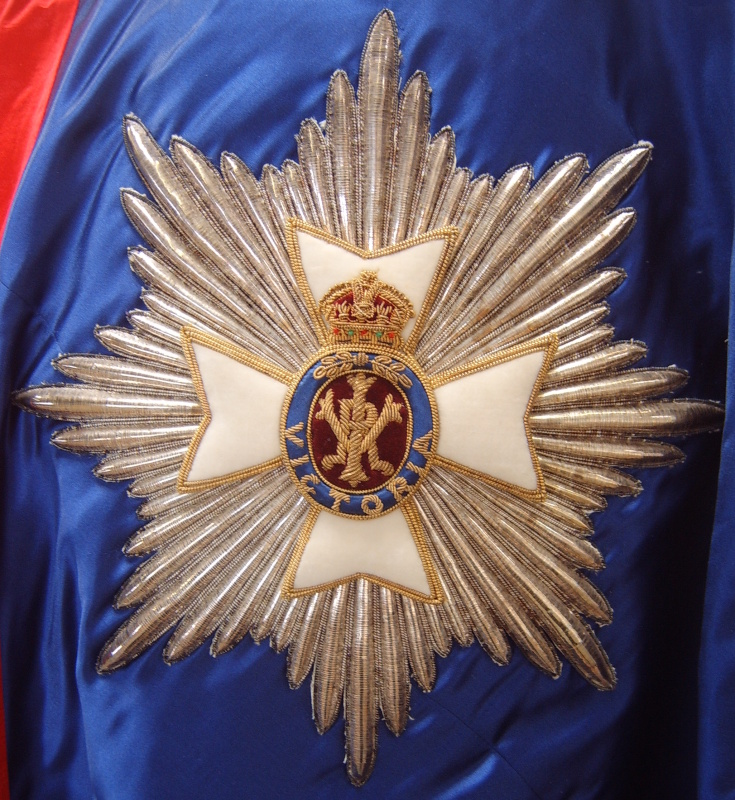
The star of a Knight or Dame Grand Cross of the Royal Victorian Order

The Royal Victorian Order is an order of knighthood awarded by the sovereign of the United Kingdom and several Commonwealth realms. It is granted personally by the monarch and recognises personal service to the monarchy, the Royal Household, royal family members, and the organisation of important royal events. The order was officially created and instituted on 23 April 1896 by letters patent under the Great Seal of the Realm by Queen Victoria. It was instituted with five grades, Knight Grand Cross (GCVO), Knight Commander (KCVO), Commander (CVO), Member (fourth class) and Member (fifth class), the last two of which were abbreviated to MVO. The two highest conferred the status of knighthood on holders; in 1984, the grade of Member (fourth class) was renamed Lieutenant (LVO), and holders of the fifth grade became Members. Women were not admitted until 1936; those receiving the highest two awards were styled Dames and those grades, when conferred on women, are Dame Grand Cross and Dame Commander (DCVO). The order could also be conferred on foreigners, who were typically appointed to honorary grades and were thus not entitled to the styles, such as Sir and Dame, associated with ordinary grades.

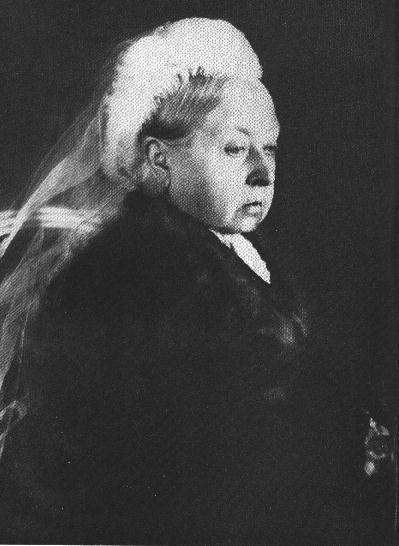
Queen Victoria (reigned 1837–1901)

No limit was placed on the number of appointments which could be made. The first two appointments were to Queen Victoria's sons, Albert Edward, Prince of Wales, and Prince Arthur, Duke of Connaught and Strathearn, who both received the highest grade on 6 May 1896. The first honorary GCVO to be appointed was Arsène Henry, the Prefect of the Alpes Maritimes, France, two days later. Queen Victoria appointed 19 Knights Grand Cross, plus an additional 28 honorary Knights Grand Cross, between the order's institution and her death on 22 January 1901; of those 19, six were to Princes of the United Kingdom—her own children, grandchildren or other close relatives—and a further seven to those already holding a peerage.

The foreign appointments included 14 Germans, six Russians, two Frenchmen, and one Austro-Hungarian, Chinese, Dane, Egyptian, Montenegrin and Spanish citizens. The King of Spain, Emperor of Germany and Prince of Montenegro were among them, along with several German princes and courtiers from Russia and Germany. Five honorary appointments were made to mark the Coronation of Nicholas II of Russia in 1896 and four to mark the occasion of the German Emperor's visit to England in 1899.

== Appointed by Queen Victoria ==
The list below is ordered by date of appointment. Full names, styles, ranks and titles are given where applicable, as correct at the time of appointment to the order. Branch of service or regiment details are given in parentheses to distinguish them from offices. The offices listed are those given in the official notice, printed in the London Gazette. Where applicable, the occasion is given that was listed either with the notices or in published material elsewhere, in which case that material is cited.

- This along with a * indicates that the appointment was Honorary.

| Name | Country | Date of appointment | Office | Occasion | Notes |
|---|---|---|---|---|---|
| Field Marshal Albert Edward, Prince of Wales | United Kingdom | 6 May 1896 | — | — | |
| General Prince Arthur William Patrick Albert, Duke of Connaught and Strathearn | United Kingdom | 6 May 1896 | — | — | |
| Arsène Henry* | France | 8 May 1896 | Préfet des Alpes Maritimes | Queen's visit to Cimiez, Nice | |
| William John Arthur Charles James Cavendish-Bentinck, 6th Duke of Portland | United Kingdom | 25 May 1896 | Master of the Horse | — | |
| Sidney Herbert, 14th Earl of Pembroke and 11th Earl of Montgomery | United Kingdom | 25 May 1896 | Lord Steward of the Household | — | |
| Charles John Colville, 10th Baron Colville of Culross KT | United Kingdom | 25 May 1896 | Chamberlain to HRH Alexandra, Princess of Wales | — | |
| General Sir Dighton MacNaghten Probyn VC KCB KCSI | United Kingdom | 25 May 1896 | Comptroller and Treasurer of the Household of HRH Albert, Prince of Wales | — | |
| Count Illarion Ivanovich Vorontsov-Dashkov* | Russian Empire | 30 May 1896 | Minister of the Imperial Court, Adjutant-General and General of Cavalry | Emperor of Russia's coronation | |
| General Otto de Richter* | Russian Empire | 30 May 1896 | Commandant of the Imperial Headquarters, General Adjutant and General of the Infantry | Emperor of Russia's coronation | |
| Count Constantine Pahlen* | Russian Empire | 30 May 1896 | Secretary of State, Actual Privy Councillor and Arch Grand Marshal | Emperor of Russia's coronation | |
| Prince Alexis Dolgorouky* | Russian Empire | 30 May 1896 | Grand Master of the Ceremonies | Emperor of Russia's coronation | |
| Major-General Prince Dmitri Galitzin* | Russian Empire | 30 May 1896 | (Caucasian Cossacks of the Line), in the staff of Nicholas II, Emperor of Russia | Emperor of Russia's coronation | |
| William Thomson, 1st Baron Kelvin | United Kingdom | 7 July 1896 | — | — | |
| Count Joachim Moltke* | Denmark | 21 July 1896 | Comptroller and Treasurer of the Household of the Crown Prince and Crown Princess of Denmark, and Chamberlain to the King of Denmark | The wedding of Prince Carl of Denmark and Princess Maud of Wales | |
| Li Hongzhang* | Chinese Empire | 5 August 1896 | — | Emperor of China's mission | |
| Count Paul Benkendarf KCVO* | Russian Empire | 31 October 1896 | Master of the Household of the Emperor of Russia | Emperor of Russia's visit to Queen Victoria | |
| Count Götz Burkhard Seckendorff* | German Empire | 6 March 1897 | Comptroller of the Household of the German Empress | — | |
| Nicholas I, Prince of Montenegro* | Montenegro | 26 March 1897 | — | — | |
| Lieutenant-General Edward von Müller* | German Empire | 28 March 1897 | Inspector-General of Rifles, Berlin | The Duke of Connaught's visit to Berlin | |
| Prince Francis Joseph of Battenberg* | German Empire | 26 April 1897 | — | — | |
| Captain Prince George Frederick Ernest Albert, Duke of York KG KT PC | United Kingdom | 30 June 1897 | — | — | |
| Field Marshal Prince George William Frederick Charles, Duke of Cambridge KG KT KP GCB GCH GCSI GCMG GCIE PC ADC | United Kingdom | 30 June 1897 | — | — | |
| Prince Albert John Charles Frederick George of Schleswig-Holstein | United Kingdom | 30 June 1897 | — | — | |
| Francis Paul Charles Louis Alexander, Duke of Teck | United Kingdom | 30 June 1897 | — | — | |
| Richard William Penn Curzon-Howe, 3rd Earl Howe CB | United Kingdom | 30 June 1897 | — | — | |
| William Henry Edgcumbe, 4th Earl of Mount Edgcumbe | United Kingdom | 30 June 1897 | — | — | |
| Count Arthur August von Mensdorff-Pouilly* | Austro-Hungarian Empire | 30 June 1897 | — | — | |
| Alfonso XIII, King of Spain* | Spain | 28 July 1897 | — | — | |
| Emich Edward Charles, the Hereditary Prince of Leiningen | German Empire | 8 September 1898 | — | — | |
| General François de Négrier* | France | 26 August 1898 | Membre du Conseil Supérieur de la Guerre, Inspecteur d'Armée | The Duke of Connaught's attendance at the recent French Military Manoeuvres | |
| Major Prince Christian Victor Albert Louis Ernest Anthony of Schleswig-Holstein | German Empire | 8 December 1898 | (King's Royal Rifle Corps) | — | |
| Prince Alfred Ernest Albert, Reigning Duke of Saxe-Coburg and Gotha, Duke of Edinburgh KG KT KP GCB GCSI GCMG GCIE PC | United Kingdom | 24 May 1899 | — | — | |
| Prince Arthur Frederick Patrick Albert of Connaught and Strathearn | United Kingdom | 24 May 1899 | — | — | |
| Prince Joachim Karl Wilhelm Fredrich Leopold of Prussia* | German Empire | 29 September 1899 | — | — | |
| Wilhelm II, German Emperor, King of Prussia* | German Empire | 21 November 1899 | — | — | |
| Count Bernhard Heinrich Karl Martin von Bülow* | German Empire | 23 November 1899 | Foreign Secretary of the German Empire | German Emperor's visit to Queen Victoria | |
| Count August zu Eulenburg* | German Empire | 23 November 1899 | Grand Marshal of the Court of the German Emperor | German Emperor's visit to Queen Victoria | |
| Hans Georg Hermann von Plessen* | German Empire | 23 November 1899 | Aide-de-camp general of the Emperor of Germany and Commandant of the Headquarters Staff | German Emperor's visit to Queen Victoria | |
| Admiral Baron Gustav von Senden-Bibran* | German Empire | 23 November 1899 | Admiral à la suite of the German Emperor and Chief of the Marine Cabinet | German Emperor's visit to Queen Victoria | |
| Gustavus Ernest, Count of Erbach-Schonberg KCVO* | German Empire | 31 March 1900 | Colonel à la suite of the Grand Ducal Hessian Army | — | |
| Freiherr August von Woellwarth-Lauterburg* | German Empire | 31 March 1900 | Chamberlain and Grand Marshal (Oberhofmarschall) of the Court of the King of Württemberg, Colonel à la suite of the Army | — | |
| Lieutenant-General Sir George Stewart White VC GCB GCSI GCIE | United Kingdom | 7 May 1900 | — | On his return from active service in South Africa | |
| Abbas Pasha, Khedive of Egypt GCB GCMG* | Egypt | 28 June 1900 | — | His visit to Queen Victoria at Windsor | |
| Henry XXX, Prince Reuss* | German Empire | 16 July 1900 | — | — | |
| John Adrian Louis Hope, 7th Earl of Hopetoun KT GCMG | United Kingdom | 19 September 1900 | Governor General of Australia, late Lord Chamberlain to Queen Victoria | — | |
| Gustav Carl Heinrich Ferdinand Emil von Arnim* | German Empire | 20 December 1900 | à la suite of the Guard, Jäger Battalion | — | |
| Lieutenant-General Gustav von Kessel* | German Empire | 18 January 1901 | Aide-de-Camp general of the German Emperor | Duke of Connaught's visit to Berlin for the Bicentenary of the foundation of the Kingdom of Prussia | |

== See also ==
- List of knights grand cross of the Royal Victorian Order appointed by Edward VII
