= Chamberlain (office) =

Person in charge of managing a household

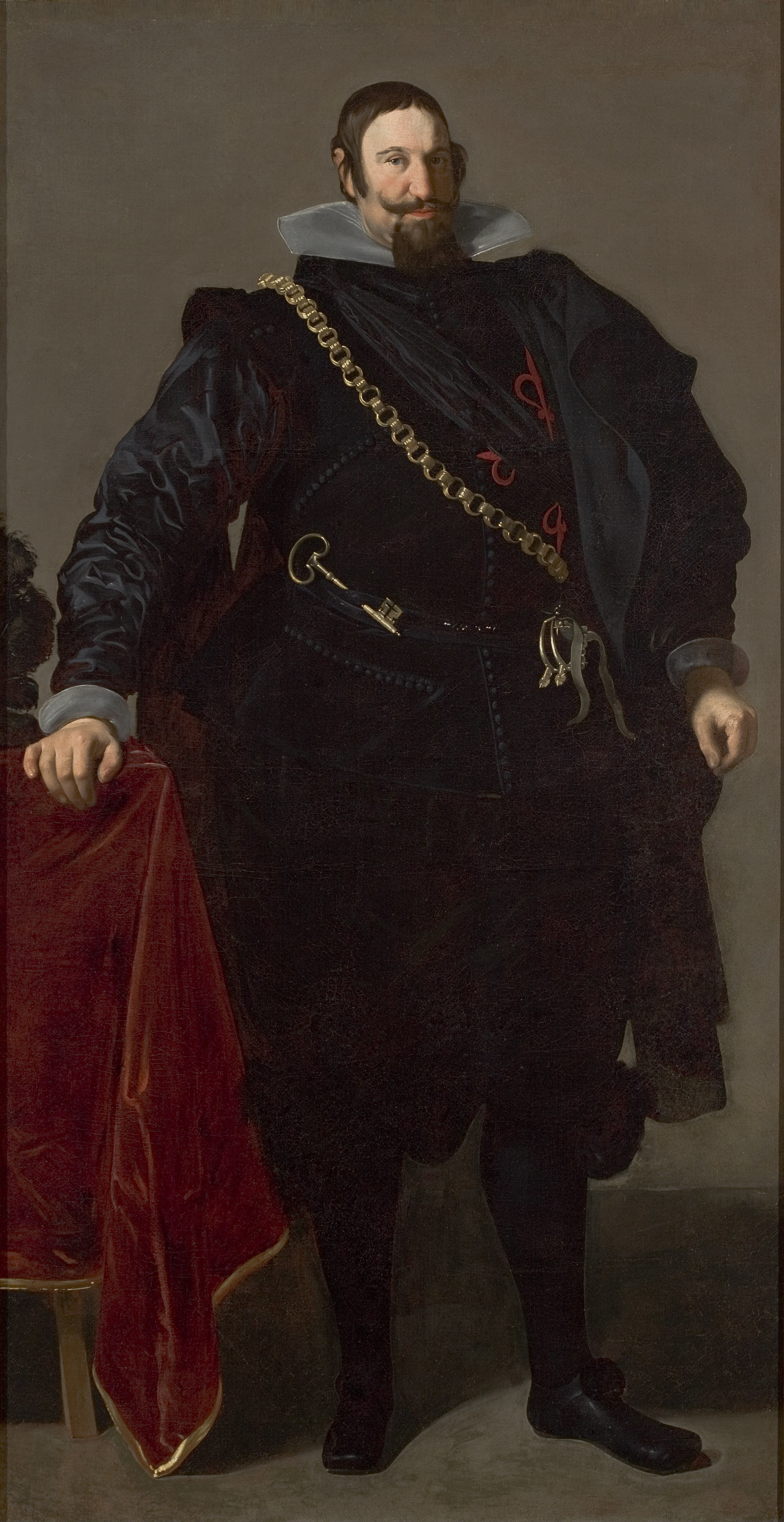
Gaspar de Guzmán, Count of Olivares, painting by Diego Velázquez, 1624. In the covenant of the royal favourites is the Chamberlain's key.

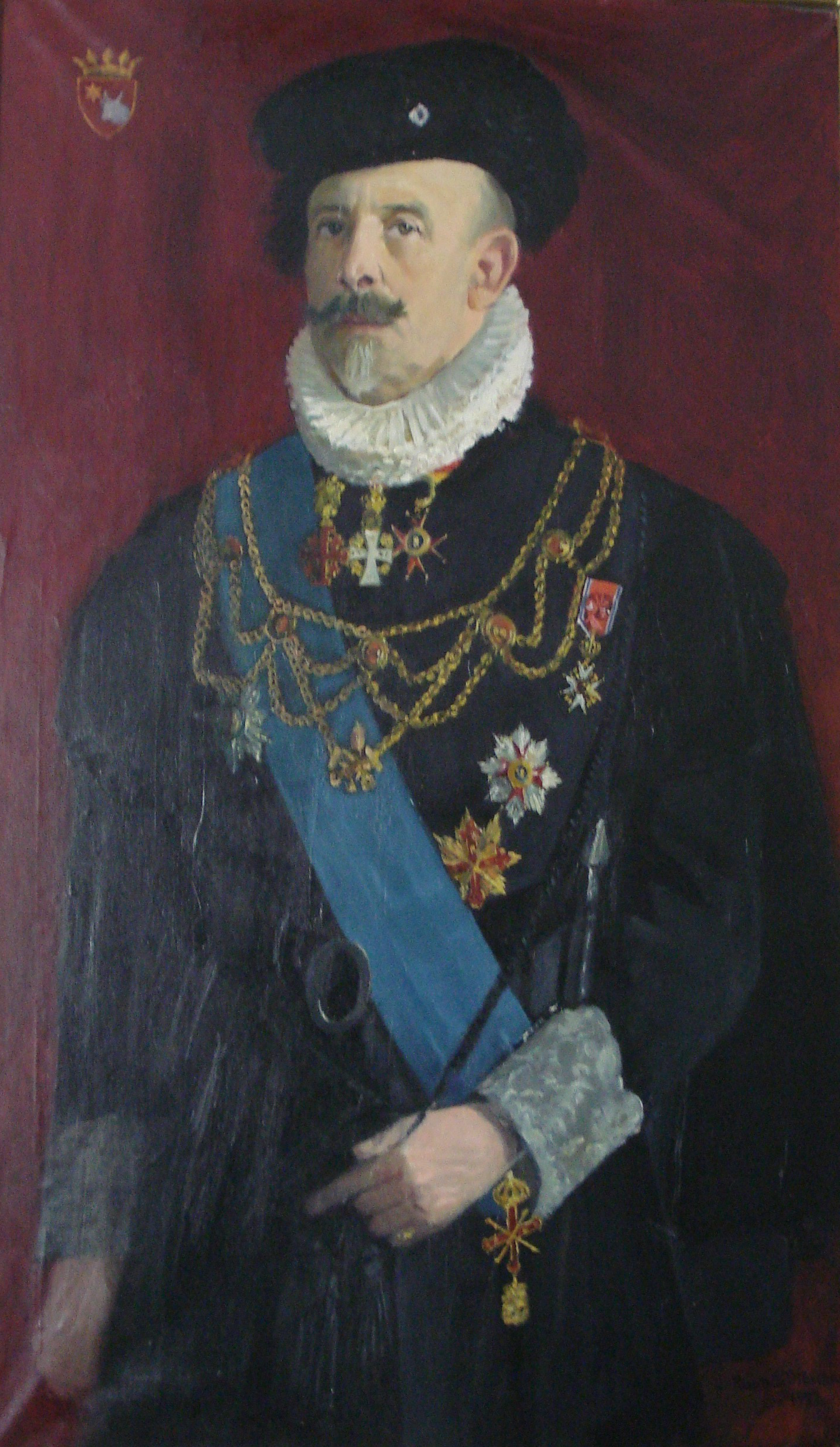
Christopher Count of Paus: appointed papal chamberlain by Pope Benedict XV in 1921. Painting in Spanish Renaissance style.

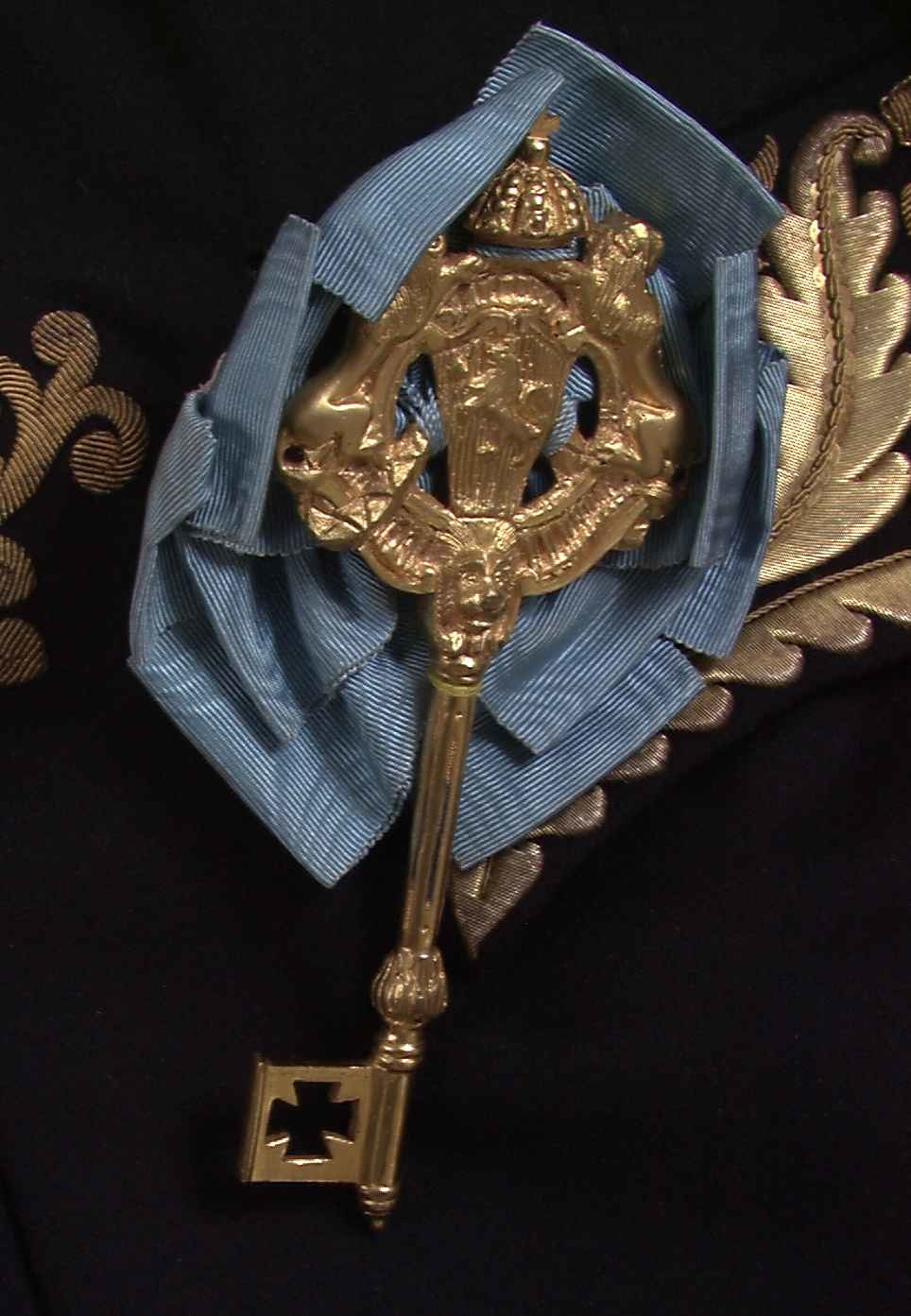
The key of a Chamberlain at the Royal Court of Norway

A chamberlain (Medieval Latin: cambellanus or cambrerius, with charge of treasury camerarius) is a senior royal official in charge of managing a royal household. Historically, the chamberlain superintends the arrangement of domestic affairs and was often also charged with receiving and paying out money kept in the royal chamber. The position was usually awarded as an honour to a high-ranking member of the nobility (nobleman) or the clergy, often a royal favourite. Roman emperors appointed this officer under the title of cubicularius. The Chamberlain of the Holy Roman Church enjoys very extensive powers, having the revenues of the papal household under his charge. As a sign of their dignity, chamberlains bore a key, which in the seventeenth century was often silvered, and actually fitted the door-locks of chamber rooms. Since the eighteenth century, it has turned into a merely symbolic, albeit splendid, rank-insignia of gilded bronze. In many countries there are ceremonial posts associated with the household of the sovereign.

== Description ==
Historically, many institutions and governments – monasteries, cathedrals and cities – also had the post of chamberlain, who usually had charge of finances. The Finance Director of the City of London is still called the Chamberlain, while New York City had a chamberlain who managed city accounts until the early 20th century.

== Etymology ==
From the Old French chamberlain, chamberlenc, Modern French chambellan, from Old High German Chamarling, Chamarlinc, whence also the Medieval Latin cambellanus, camerlingus, camerlengus; Italian camerlingo; Spanish camerlengo, compounded of Old High German Chamara, Kamara [Latin camera, "chamber"], and the German suffix -ling.

== Posts ==
Some of the principal posts known by this name:

=== Austria ===
- Kammerherr, or Kämmerer (with a charge of finances, treasury)

=== Brunei ===
- Grand Chamberlain of The Councils of Brunei titled as Yang Amat Mulia Pengiran Penggawa Laila Bentara Istiadat Diraja Dalam Istana. The current Grand Chamberlain is Pengiran Haji Alauddin Pengiran Paduka Tuan Pengiran Haji Abu Bakar.

Around the year of 2012, The Grand Chamberlain of The Council, Alauddin bin Abu Bakar, on emergency broadcast had announced the divorce between the Sultan and his third wife.

June 7, 2015. The Grand Chamberlain of Brunei announced the newborn prince of Deputy Sultan, Crown Prince of Brunei.

=== Byzantine Empire ===
- Koubikoularios
- Parakoimomenos
- Praepositus sacri cubiculi

=== Denmark ===
- Hofmarskallen (Court Marshal)
  - Kammerherre
  - Kammerdame
- Lord Chamberlain of Denmark

=== France ===
- Grand Chamberlain of France
- Grand Chamberman of France

=== Germany ===
- Kammerherr, or Kämmerer (with a charge of finances, treasury)

=== Holy Roman Empire ===
- Kammerherr, or Kämmerer (with a charge of finances, treasury)
- Reichskämmerer (imperial chamberlain)
- Lord Chamberlain of the Archduchess

=== Japan ===
- Grand Chamberlain of Japan and Chamberlain of Japan

=== Norway ===
- Lord Chamberlain of Norway

=== Poland ===
- Podkomorzy

=== Portugal ===
- Chamberlain-Major of Portugal
- Chamberlain of the Prince of Portugal

=== Roman Empire ===
- Admissionales
- Praepositus sacri cubiculi
- Cubicularius

=== Russian Empire ===
Ober-Kammerherr or Kammerherr (Russian: обер-камергер or камергер). Historically, postelnichiy (постельничий) was the ceremonial post at the court of a Grand Duke. Later, in 1772, at the court of the Tsar the German term Kammerherr was introduced. The Ober-Kammerherr was responsible for the audiences granted to members of the Royal Family. Since the beginning of the 18th century, the Ober-Kammerherr was the most senior appointed official of the Russian Imperial Court associated with the household of the sovereign. The most notable figures were:

- Prince Alexander Danilovich Menshikov 1727 - 1728
- Prince Ivan Alekseevich Dolgorukov 1730 - 1740
- Duke Ernst Johann von Biron 1730 - 1740
- Count Pyotr Borisovich Sheremetev 1761 - 1768
- Boris Vladimirovich Stürmer 1916–1917, the last Ober-Kammerherr of Tsar Nicholas II.

=== Serbia in the Middle Ages ===
- Kaznac

=== Sweden ===
In Sweden there are ten serving chamberlains (Swedish: kammarherrar) and four serving cabinet chamberlains (kabinettskammarherrar) at the royal court. The chamberlains are not employed by the court but serve during ceremonial occasions such as state visits, audiences, and official dinners.

=== Thailand ===
In Thailand the head of the Bureau of the Royal Household is titled the Lord Chamberlain (เลขาธิการพระราชวัง). He has several Grand Chamberlains as his deputy, usually in charge of a specific portfolio.

=== United Kingdom ===
- Lord Great Chamberlain (one of the Great Officers of State)
- Lord Chamberlain (senior executive Officer of the Royal Household)
- Chamberlain of the City of London (a High Officer of the City Corporation, its Director of Finance. The appointment of a City Chamberlain is first recorded in 1276; his duties related to the City Chamber, where monies were kept. He also presided over the admission of Freemen of the City of London, and continues to do so today.)
- Chamberlain of the Exchequer, treasury official in the English Exchequer
- Lord Chamberlain of Scotland (a historic Office of State in the Kingdom of Scotland from 1124 to 1703)

=== United States ===
- Chamberlain of the City of New York

=== Vatican ===
- Camerlengo of the Holy Roman Church
- Papal Gentleman (formerly known as Papal Chamberlain (Cameriere di spada e cappa))

== See also ==
- Court appointment
- Hajib, a similar post in Muslim monarchies
