= Royal Household of Denmark =

The Royal Household of Denmark (Danish: Det Kongelige Danske Hof) (also called the Royal Court of Denmark, and colloquially known as "The Court" (Danish: Hoffet)) is the establishment and the collective departments which supports the monarch and members of the Danish royal family. The Royal Household supports and assists members of the royal family in the planning and in the exercise of their royal duties and prerogatives.

The incumbent monarch, Frederik X, is head of the Royal Household.

The members of the royal family each have their own small administration, called a Court State. The largest is King Frederik's Court State. The administrative part of the Royal Household is situated in The Yellow Palace on Amaliegade.

== Court States ==
The Royal Household currently employs approximately 130 people and is divided by function into a number of administrative departments called court states (Danish: Hofstat).

=== His Majesty the King's Court state ===
==== The Court Marshal ====
The Court Marshal of Denmark is the Chief Administrative Officer of the Royal Household.

This role traditionally fell to the Lord Chamberlain of Denmark, but this title is no longer used, and all the roles associated with the title has allocated to the Court Marshal.

==== The Court Marshal's office ====
The Court Marshal's office is the secretariat for The King. The office is in charge of all the arrangements for official functions, such as state visits at home and abroad, dinners and luncheons, and court ceremonies, including presentation of credentials by ambassadors as well as their farewell audiences.

==== The Master of Ceremonies ====
The Master of Ceremonies is responsible for the ceremonial events, e.g. the organization of state visits and official parties.

==== The Office of Treasury ====
The Treasurer of the Royal Household is responsible for the Office of the Treasury, which handles the overall budgeting, accounts for the Civil List and administration of the royal foundations. The Treasurer is also responsible for all the Monarch's palaces and properties, IT, security and the Royal Warrants.

==== The Master of the Household's Department ====
The Master of the Household's Department is responsible for a wide range of functions, including valet service, food and drink service at functions, travel and luggage arrangements, driving, management of wine cellars, cooking and housekeeping. Coordinated by the Master of the Household, the department is divided into branches managed by two Chasseurs, the Chef de Cuisine and the Matron of the Household.

==== Craft Section ====
The Master Craftsman is responsible for the functions of the Household Workshop. Its personnel include cabinet makers, a painter, a decorator and a dressmaker. The Household Workshop is also at the disposal of external craftsmen hired to perform specific conservation and preservation services.

==== The Royal Mews ====
The Royal Mews oversees ceremonial coaches, vehicles and horses. The horses are used for pulling coaches and for the Royal Family's pleasure and leisure riding. The Royal Mews is in charge of all ceremonial driving.

==== The King's Reference Library ====
The King's (or Queen's) reference library was established at Christiansborg Castle by Frederik VI. in 1746 and has since become a permanent institution. The library is run by the King's Librarian of the Reference Library.

==== The aides-de-camp to the King (The King's Military Household) ====
The aides-de-camp to the King (also called The King's Military Household) is an agency of the Ministry of Defence which is made available to the King as head of state. The aides-de-camp to the King is the formal link between the Royal Family and the Armed Forces. The staff consists of nine people: an adjutant chief of staff, who has the rank of Army Colonel and two adjutants from each branch of the Armed Forces (Army, Navy and Air Force) with the rank of major/naval captain as well as two constables.

==== The office of The Captain of the Royal Yacht ====
The Captain of the Royal Yacht is a commander in the Navy and captain of the Royal Yacht Dannebrog and is the King's direct contact with the Navy and advisor on maritime matters.

==== Master of The Royal Hunt at the State Forests ====
The Master of the Royal Hunt is a state-forester and is the linking element between the Danish Royal Family and the state forests. He organizes the annual Royal hunts.

==== The Royal Konfessionarius (Chaplain-in-Ordinary) ====
The Royal Konfessionarius (equivalent to Chaplain-in-Ordinary) is the King's personal spiritual advisor and counsellor and the royal family's private priest.

==== Private Secretary's Office ====
The Private Secretary's Office is headed by the Private Secretary to the King. The Private Secretary's Office assists with His Majesty the King's role as head of state. The incumbent Private Secretary to the King is Morten Roland Hansen.

The Queen likewise has a Private Secretary, currently Henriette Ellermann-Kingombe.

==== The Chapter of the Royal Danish Orders of Knighthood ====
The institution is colloquially called the Order Chapter (equivalent to the College of Arms). It was founded in connection with the reorganization of the Order of the Dannebrog in 1808. It is historically not part of the court states, as it stands directly under the monarch as the Chancellor of the Order.

=== Queen Margrethe's Court State ===
The court state is headed by the Chief of Staff.

=== Prince Joachim and Princess Marie's Court state ===
The court state is headed by the private secretary.

=== Princess Benedikte's Court state ===
The court state is headed by the private secretary.
