= Lord Chamberlain of Denmark =

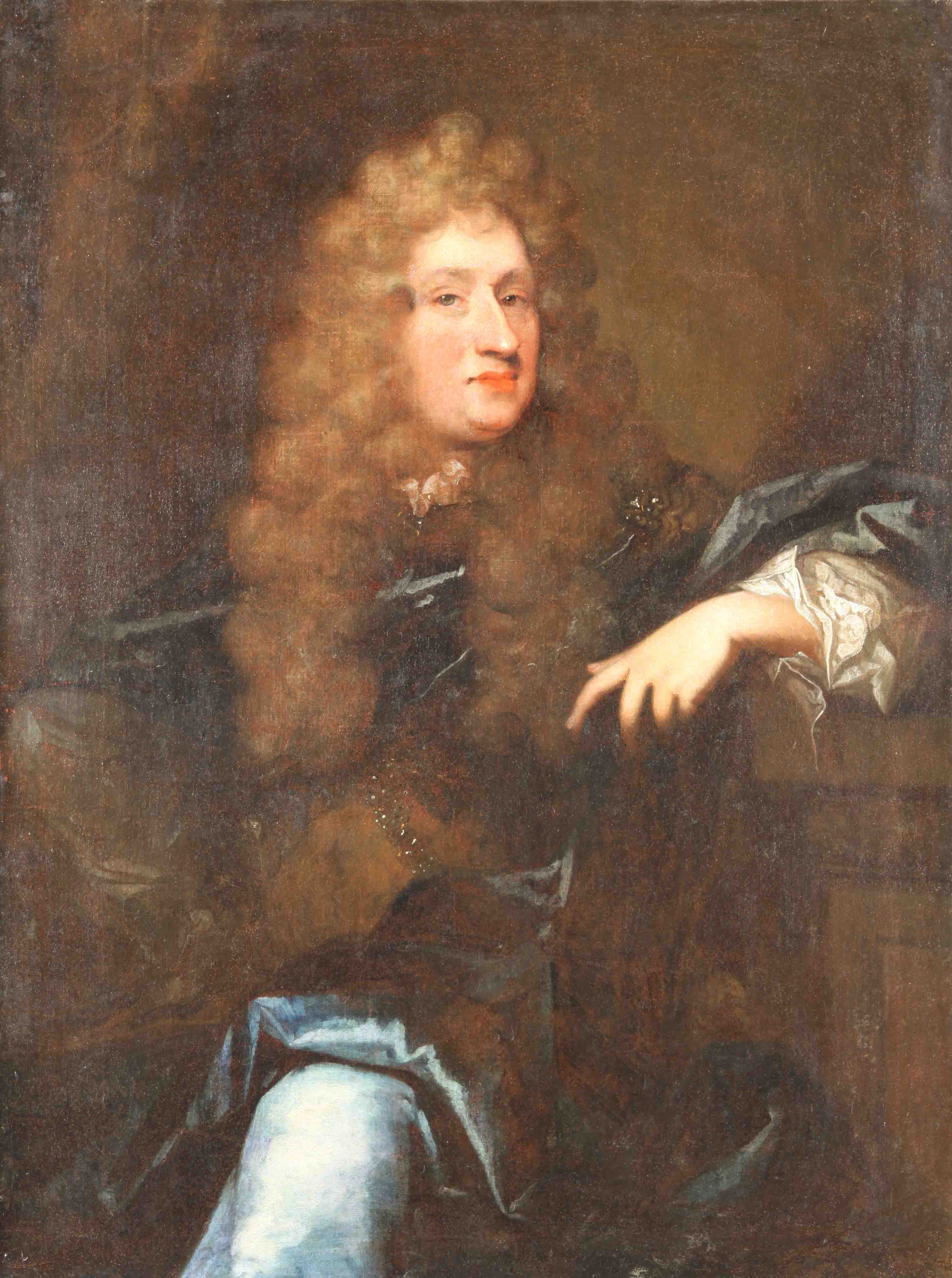
Ulrik Frederik Gyldenløve, Count of Laurvig, the illegitimate son of King Frederick III of Denmark, was Lord Chamberlain of Denmark.

The Lord Chamberlain of Denmark (Danish: Overkammerherre) is the highest office of the Royal Household of Denmark, and the most distinguished of the Chamberlains of the Royal Household. The title corresponds to the British title Lord Chamberlain of the Household.

The title gives precedence in the 1st Class No. 8 in the Danish order precedence, and the bearer is thus entitled to the style "His/Her Excellency". The title still exists by Royal Regulation, but it is not in current use: Queen Margrethe preferred to appoint Chamberlains, of which there were 115 in Denmark as of 2015. The Historic role of the Lord Chamberlain is now allocated to the Court Marshal of Denmark (Danish: Hofmarskal).

== Lord Chamberlains ==
This is a list of the Lord Chamberlains of Denmark. The office was not always held continuously.

Portrait	Name	Tenure	Notes
	Ulrik Frederik Gyldenløve	1671–?	The illegitimate son of Frederick III of Denmark.
	Christian Gyldenløve	1696–1699	An illegitimate son of Christian V of Denmark with Sophie Amalie Moth.
	Carl lensgreve (von) Ahlefeldt	1699–1708	Chamberlain from 1695.
	Christian Ditlev Lensgreve Reventlow	1719–	
	Carl Adolph von Plessen	1730–1758	The Chief Chamberlain of Prince Charles of Denmark from 1708 to 1729.
	Ditlev Lensgreve Reventlow		He carried Queen Caroline Matilda of Great Britain's coronation gown in 1767.
	Vacant		
	Christian Frederik (von) Numsen	1781–1784	
	Hans Henrik von Eickstedt	1784–	
	Joachim Godske Lensgreve Moltke	1815–1818	Also Prime Minister of Denmark.
	Adam Wilhelm Hauch	1828–	Also Lord Marshal of the Court (Danish: Overhofmarskal) and Lord Master of the Horse (Danish: Overstaldmester)
	Johan Sigismund von Møsting	1840–1843	
	Poul Christian (von) Stemann	1848–	He was appointed Lord Chamberlain of Denmark at the time of his resignation as Prime Minister.
	August Adam Wilhelm Lensgreve Moltke	1864	
	Christian Conrad Sophus Lensgreve Danneskiold-Samsøe	1864–1867	
	Waldemar Tully Oxholm	1876–1876	Also Lord Marshal of the Court (Danish: Overhofmarskal)
	Ludvig Henrik Carl Herman Lensgreve Holstein-Holsteinborg	1876-1881	Also Council President of Denmark (Prime Minister)
	Oscar Siegfried Christian O'Neill Oxholm	1918–1926	Also Lord Marshal of the Court (Danish: Overhofmarskal)
	Vacant: Not in use	1926–present	
