= Court Marshal of Denmark =

Chief Administrative Officer of the Royal Household of Denmark

Marshal of the Court
- Hofmarskal (Danish)
- Incumbent; Christian Schønau since 14 January 2024
- Royal Household of Denmark
- Seat: Yellow Palace, Copenhagen
- Appointer: the Monarch

The Marshal of the Court of Denmark (Danish: Hofmarskal; officially translated as lord chamberlain) is Chief Administrative Officer of the Royal Household of Denmark. The court marshal is the chief executive of finance, staff, official duties, etc. and heads the court marshal's office. This role traditionally fell to the Lord Marshal of the Court (Danish: Overhofmarskal), but this title is no longer used, and all the responsibilities associated with the title have been allocated to the Marshal of the Court.

== Court marshals ==
Until 1912, there were in periods also a Lord Marshal of the Court, who was the superior of the Marshal of the Court, if one was employed at the same time. Both are listed.

Portrait	Name (born-died)	Term of office			Monarch(s)	Ref.
Portrait	Name (born-died)	Took office	Left office	Time in office	Monarch(s)	Ref.
	Johan Christopher von Körbitz (1612–1682)	1658	1661	2–3 years	Frederick III	
	Christoffer Sehested (1628–1699)	1661	1670	8–9 years	Frederick III	
	Helmuth Otto von Winterfeld (1617–1694); Lord Marshal of the Court of Denmark	1670	1679	8–9 years	Christian V	
	Frantz Eberhard von Speckhahn (1628–1697); Lord Marshal of the Court of Denmark (1681–1683)	1679	1681	1–2 years	Christian V	
	Johan Otto Raben (1646–1719)	1683	1697	13–14 years	Christian V	
	Peter Christoph von der Osten (1659–1730)	1697	1699	1–2 years	Christian V	
	Ludwig Staats von Hahn (?–?)	1699	1705	5–6 years	Frederick IV	
	Wilhelm Friedrich von Platen (1667–1732)	1706	1716	9–10 years	Frederick IV	
	Otto Carl von Callenberg (1686–1759); Lord Marshal of the Court of Denmark (1717–1719)	1716	1717	0–1 years	Frederick IV	
	Wilhelm Moritz Münck von Buseck (?–?)	1719	1721	1–2 years	Frederick IV	
	Christian von Holstein (1678–1747); Lord Marshal of the Court of Denmark	1721	1724	2–3 years	Frederick IV	
	Otto Blome (1684–1738); Lord Marshal of the Court of Denmark	1724	1730	5–6 years	Frederick IV; Christian VI	
	Adam Levin von Witzleben (1688–1745); Lord Marshal of the Court of Denmark	1730	1735	4–5 years	Christian VI	
	Friedrich Carl von Gram (1702–1782); Lord Marshal of the Court of Denmark (1739–1741)	1735	1739	3–4 years	Christian VI	
	Johann Christoph von Reitzenstein (1698–1767); Lord Marshal of the Court of Denmark (1743–1746)	1741	1743	1–2 years	Frederick V	
	Adam Gottlob Moltke (1710–1792)	1746	1766	19–20 years	Frederick V	
	Christian Frederik Moltke (1736–1771); Son of previous. Lord Marshal of the Court of Denmark (1767–1771)	1766	1767	0–1 years	Christian VII	
	Conrad Holck (1745–1800)	1767	1770	2–3 years	Christian VII	
	Henrik Bielke (1750–1811)	1771	1772	0–1 years	Christian VII	
	Count Christian Frederik Holstein (1735–1799); Lord Marshal of the Court of Denmark	1772	1780	7–8 years	Christian VII	
	Engel Schack (1750–1811); Lord Marshal of the Court of Denmark	1780	1784	3–4 years	Christian VII	
	Christian Numsen (1741–1811); Lord Marshal of the Court of Denmark	1784	1791	6–7 years	Christian VII	
	Christian Ludvig Kalkreuth (?–?); Lord Marshal of the Court of Denmark	1791	1792	0–1 years	Christian VII	
	Wilhelm Theodor Wegener (1724–1792)	1791	1792	0–1 years	Christian VII	
	Count Ferdinand Anton Christian Ahlefeldt (?–?)	1792	1794	1–2 years	Christian VII	
	Adam Wilhelm Hauch (1755–1838); Lord Marshal of the Court of Denmark (1798–1838). Also Lord Chamberlain of Denmark.	1794	1798	3–4 years	Christian VII; Frederick VI	
	Christian Ove Haxthausen (1777–1842); Lord Marshal of the Court of Denmark (1840–1842)	1838	1840	1–2 years	Frederick VI; Christian VIII	
	Joachim Godsche von Levetzau (1782–1859); Lord Marshal of the Court of Denmark (1845–1859)	1842	1845	2–3 years	Christian VIII; Frederick VII	
	Carl Ludvig Løvenskjold (1822–1898); Lord Marshal of the Court of Denmark (1881–1898)	1860	1881	20–21 years	Frederick VII; Christian IX	
	Waldemar Tully Oxholm (1805–1876); Lord Marshal of the Court of Denmark (1863–1876). Also Lord Chamberlain of Denmark.	1863	1876	12–13 years	Christian IX	
	Oscar Siegfred O'Neill Oxholm (1863–1948); Also Lord Chamberlain of Denmark.	1898	1906	7–8 years	Christian IX	
	Count Joachim Moltke (1857–1943)	1906	1908	1–2 years	Frederik VIII	
	Count Frands Brockenhuus-Schack (1863–1948); Lord Marshal of the Court of Denmark (1911–1912). Last Lord Marshal of the Court of Denmark.	1908	1911	2–3 years	Frederik VIII; Christian X	
	William Carlton Rothe (?–?)	1912	1926	13–14 years	Christian X	
	Carl Julius Engelbrecht Juel (1862–1941)	1926	1939	12–13 years	Christian X	
	Count Christopher Trampe (1879–1957)	1939	1947	7–8 years	Christian X	
	Johan Vest (1893–1966)	1947	1963	15–16 years	Frederik IX	
	Holger Eigil Wern (?–?)	1963	1968	4–5 years	Frederik IX	
	Count Karl Christian Trampe (1924–2014)	1968	1972	3–4 years	Frederik IX	
	Kjeld Gustav Knuth-Winterfeldt (1908–1992)	1972	1976	3–4 years	Margrethe II	
	Hans Sølvhøj (1919–1989)	1976	1989	12–13 years	Margrethe II	
	Søren Haslund-Christensen (1933–2021)	1989	2003	13–14 years	Margrethe II	
	Ove Ullerup (born 1951)	1 September 2003	1 September 2014	11 years, 0 days	Margrethe II	
	Michael Ehrenreich (born 1954)	15 February 2015	31 March 2021	6 years, 44 days	Margrethe II	
	Kim Kristensen (born 1964)	31 March 2021	14 January 2024	2 years, 289 days	Margrethe II	
	Christian Schønau (born 1966)	14 January 2024	Incumbent	2 years, 236 days	Frederik X	

== See also ==
- Lord Chamberlain of Denmark
