= List of newspapers in the Faroe Islands =

There are several newspapers on the Faroe Islands, ranging from single man publications about local news to widely distributed publications reporting on international events and business news.

== Dimmalætting ==
Dimmalætting (Faroese for "dawn") is the oldest and largest newspaper of the Faroe Islands and is based in Tórshavn.

The first edition of the Dimma, as it is commonly known, appeared (after a test issue on December 8, 1877) on January 5, 1878. Today it has a print run of 8,500 copies (in 1991 it was 13,300) and appears five days weekly. As an answer to competing papers, the Tuesday edition has been delivered free of charge to all households since April 5, 2005.

Since the founding of the Unionist Party in 1906, Dimma was the party paper, but it has since declared itself independent 1995. However, as of 2005, the chief has still been an automatic member of the Unionist party leadership.

The name Dimmalætting combines the word dimmi (darkness) and lætting, from the verb lætta (leave). Dimmið lættir means "it is becoming daytime", or literally, "the darkness is dwindling". The paper's name comes from Venceslaus Ulricus Hammershaimb, the creator of the modern orthography of Faroese.

The Danish name for the paper was the Amtstidene for Færøerne ("official paper for the Faroese"), and its Faroese name was printed in small letters. In its early years, the paper was only published in the Danish language. Then, from 1910 to 1947, it was printed in both languages, and in the years since 1947, Faroese has dominated.

Until 1911, when a Wednesday edition began, the paper only appeared on Saturdays. In the 1920s, the paper expanded to six pages from the previous four. After 1970, the page count rose to eight or more. A third edition was added, and from September 1996, it has appeared five times a week from Tuesday to Saturday. In November 2004, the days were changed to Monday to Friday. Since the middle of March 2005, it has appeared in a smaller format.

The newspaper went bankrupt and folded in October 2013, and restarted in 2014 as a weekly newspaper.

== Local.fo ==
Local.fo was founded in January 2018 by Jens Hákun Leo and Torleif Joensen, currently serving as the only news service in the Faroe Islands to exclusively publish in English. In addition to the website, Local.fo also publishes a physical newspaper, which is distributed free of charge.

== Norðlýsið ==
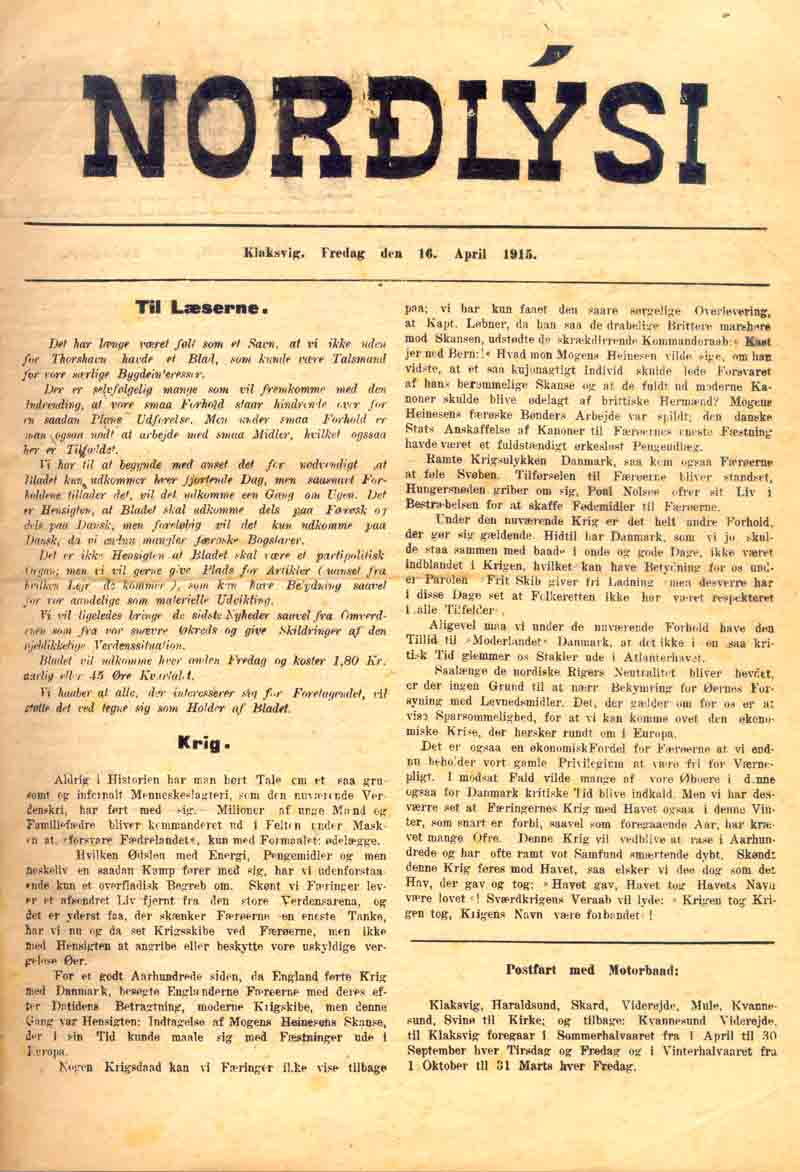
Norðlýsið

Norðlýsið is a Faroese newspaper and in recent years also a newsportal, which has a mainly local northern islands focus on its news, with its base in Klaksvík.

== Oyggjatíðindi ==
Oyggjatíðindi was a Faroese newspaper, and since 2011 it is an internet newsportal. It is written mainly by one man, Faroese reporter Dan Klein.

== Sosialurin ==
Sosialurin is a Faroese newspaper, founded in 1927. Originally it was associated with the Social Democrats, but in 2006 the political party sold their part of the shares. The newspaper in partnership with Føroya Tele, a Faroese telecom, operates the website Portal.fo.

== Vikublaðið ==
Vikublaðið was a free Faroese weekly newspaper. In a national survey, it came out as the most read newspaper on the islands. It became online-only in 2008.

== Vinnuvitan ==
Vinnuvitan was the only newspaper on the Faroe Islands that dealt with business issues exclusively. It now exists only on the internet. It was first published in December 2004. It was originally published every other week, but later the newspaper had grown in size and popularity and was published every Thursday for some years. In addition to the newspaper, Vinnuvitan was also a publishing house, releasing a small number of books each year, including Skipalistin and Okkara Sangbók.

Vinnuvitan was also the founder and organizer of the annual Faroese Advertising Awards (Kolan). It was chosen Best Achievement of 2006 (Ársins Átak) by the Faroese House of Industry.

== See also ==
- Dúgvan
- Føringatíðindi
- Tingakrossur
- Media of the Faroe Islands
