= Mass media in the Faroe Islands =

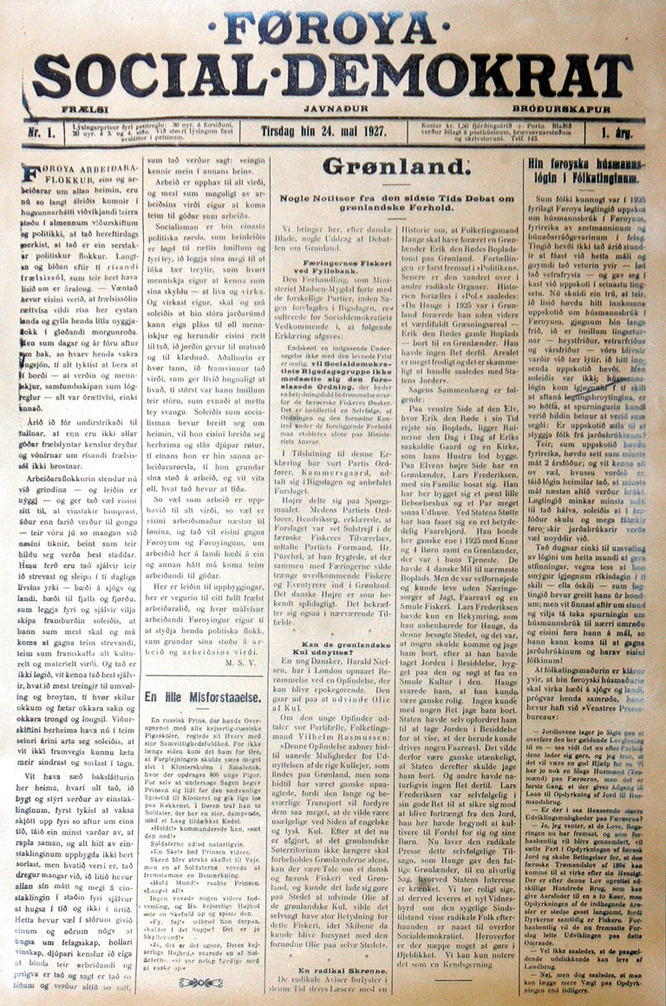
Front page of Føroya Social Democrat

The Faroese mass media consists of several newspapers, radio stations, magazines, as well as a local TV station, Kringvarp Føroya.

The first Digital Terrestrial Television service was switched on during December 2002, broadcasting from seven transmitter sites. Subscription satellite television is also available in the Faroe Islands.

== List of major media in the Faroese language ==
In 2005, Sjónvarp Føroya (Television of the Faroes) and Útvarp Føroya (Radio of the Faroes) merged into a new company called Kringvarp Føroya.

=== Television ===
- SVF (since 1984). The only local TV station, today a part of Kringvarp Føroya.
- A satellite TV company used to relay MTV Europe, BBC Prime, BBC World, and Eurosport, as well as Danish commercial TV into Tórshavn between 1989 and 2001.
- Since 2002 Televarpið (a subsidiary of the Faroese telecom company Føroya Tele) has distributed Sjónvarp Føroya and international channels through its digital terrestrial network, which include DR1, DR2, TV2, TV2 Sport, TV3, TV3+, Kanal 4, Kanal 5, 6'eren, NRK1, Visjon Norge, RÚV, MTV, VH1, BBC Brit, BBC World News, Eurosport, Cartoon Network, Discovery Channel, Animal Planet, Disney Channel, National Geographic Channel, Canal+ Comedy, Canal+ First, Canal+ Sport 1, Canal+ Sport 2.

=== Radio ===
- Atlantic Radio, short-lived 24-hour station.
- KissFM, pop and rock from the 1970s, 1980s and 1990s, was replaced with the new Rás 2.
- Kringvarp Føroya started in 1957 as Útvarp Føroya. Merged with Sjónvarp Føroya 1 January 2007 to form Kringvarp Føroya.
- Lindin, a Christian radio station which has been broadcasting from Tórshavn since 21 January 2000
- Rás 2 (Channel 2) was, after Atlantic Radio stopped, established as an alternative to the state owned Útvarp Føroya (hence the "2" in its name).
- Stream.fo, on FM98.7 in Klaksvík and on internet radio, which has been broadcasting since 11 November 2011
- Útvarp Føroya
- Voxpop, modern pop music station

=== Newspapers ===
- Dimmalætting, the oldest newspaper on the islands, dating back to 1878. A weekly newspaper since 2014
- Norðlýsið, a local newspaper mainly for the northern part of the islands.
- Oyggjatíðindi
- Sosialurin, established in 1927. Originally it was a political newspaper associated with Faroese social democrats, but in 2006 the Islands' Social Democratic Party sold the newspaper. It is published five times a week.
- Vikublaðið, a weekly newspaper. It is the only newspaper that is free, so is the most widely read newspaper on the Islands.
- Vinnuvitan, a business newspaper.

=== Magazines ===
- Atlantic Review, since 1990. Atlantic Airways
- Frøði, a local science magazine.
- Kvinna, a women's magazine established in 2004.
- Land og Fólk
- OutsiderMagazine, Varðin, Vencil: cultural magazines.
