= Mikkelsen =

Mikkelsen is a Danish-Norwegian patronymic surname meaning "son of Mikkel" (equivalent of Michael). People with the name Mikkelsen include:

== People ==
=== Entertainment ===
- Ella Augusta Drori Mikkelsen (born 2005), Danish singer
- Fredrik Mikkelsen (born 1981), Norwegian musician and composer
- Jarl Friis-Mikkelsen (born 1951), Danish actor, TV and radio host
- Jannicke Mikkelsen (born 1986), Norwegian cinematographer
- Kurtis Dam-Mikkelsen (born 1985), American model, makeup artist, and drag queen
- Laila Mikkelsen (1940–2023), Norwegian film producer
- Lars Mikkelsen (born 1964), Danish actor
- Mads Mikkelsen (born 1965), Danish actor
- Malka Mikkelsen (born 1973), Colombian-American musician
- Terje Mikkelsen (born 1957), Norwegian conductor

=== Politicians ===
- Brian Mikkelsen (born 1966), Danish politician
- Helmer Mikkelsen (1930–1989), Norwegian politician
- Jan Mikkelsen (1933–2017), Norwegian politician
- Jens Kramer Mikkelsen (born 1951), Danish politician
- Jeppe Tranholm-Mikkelsen (born 1962), Danish diplomat
- Kenneth Mikkelsen (born 1971), Danish politician
- Mikkel Mikkelsen, Danish West Indies politician
- Sonja Mikkelsen (born 1955), Danish politician
- William Mikkelsen (1901–1962), Norwegian politician

=== Sportspeople ===
- Achton Mikkelsen (born 1932), Danish boxer
- Aksel Malling Mikkelsen (born 1948), Danish equestrian
- Andreas Mikkelsen (born 1989), Norwegian rally driver
- Arne Mikkelsen (born 1944), Norwegian ice hockey player
- August Mikkelsen (born 2000), Norwegian footballer
- Bernie Mikkelsen (born 1950), Canadian snooker player
- Birna Tummasardóttir Mikkelsen (born 1994), Faroese footballer
- Dag Martin Mikkelsen (born 1986), Norwegian poker player
- Hans Mikkelsen (1914–2004), Danish rower
- Henriette Mikkelsen (born 1980), Danish handball player
- Jákup Mikkelsen (born 1970), Faroese footballer
- Jesper Mikkelsen (born 1980), Danish footballer
- Karin Mikkelsen, Danish cricketer
- Kim Mikkelsen (born 1965), Danish footballer
- Lasse Mikkelsen (born 1998), Danish footballer
- Lasse Mikkelsen (born 1988), Danish handball player
- Mads Boe Mikkelsen (born 1999), Faroese footballer
- Martin Mikkelsen (born 1986), Danish footballer
- Mikkel Mikkelsen (born 1992), Danish badminton player
- Mogens Just Mikkelsen (born 1962), Danish sailor
- Niels Mikkelsen (1902–1964), Danish equestrian
- Niels-Ove Mikkelsen, Danish Olympian
- Ole Mikkelsen (born 1959), Norwegian-American soccer forward
- Paula Mikkelsen (born 1980), Faroese footballer
- Pete Mikkelsen (1939–2006), American baseball player
- Peter Mikkelsen (badminton) (born 1982), Danish badminton player
- Peter Mikkelsen (referee) (1960–2019), Danish football referee
- Peter Nymann Mikkelsen (born 1982), Danish footballer
- Ragnhild Mikkelsen (1931–2008), Norwegian speed skater
- Roy Mikkelsen (1907–1967), American ski jumper
- Thomas Korsgaard Mikkelsen (born 1983), Danish footballer
- Thomas Mikkelsen (born 1990), Danish footballer
- Tobias Mikkelsen (born 1986), Danish footballer
- Vern Mikkelsen (1928–2013), American basketball player

=== Other ===
- Aksel Mikkelsen (1849–1929), Danish educator
- Bård Mikkelsen (born 1948), Norwegian businessperson
- Caroline Mikkelsen (1906–1998), Danish-Norwegian explorer
- Canute Mikkelsen (1451–1478), Danish Bishop of Viborg
- Ejnar Mikkelsen (1880–1971), Danish polar explorer
- Henning Dahl Mikkelsen (1915–1982), Danish cartoonist
- Knut Ragnar Mikkelsen (born 1951), Norwegian police chief
- Maiken Mikkelsen, Physicist
- Maria Mikkelsen (1877–1956), Promoter of Faroese language
- Tom Mikkelsen (born 1959), Canadian neuro-oncologist

== Other uses ==
- HDMS Ejnar Mikkelsen (P571), 2007 Knud Rasmussen-class patrol vessel
- Mikkelsen Bay, Bay along the west coast of Graham Land, Antarctica
- Mikkelsen Islands, Group of islands in Antarctica
- Mikkelsen Peak, Mountain in Antarctica
- Mount Caroline Mikkelsen, Mountain in Princess Elizabeth Land, Antarctica
