= Governor Esmit =

Governor Esmit may refer to:

- Adolph Esmit, Governor of St. Thomas from 1683 to 1684 and from 1687 to 1688
- Nicolai Esmit, Governor of St. Thomas from 1680 to 1682
