= Maria Mikkelsen =

Promoter of Faroese language (1877–1956)

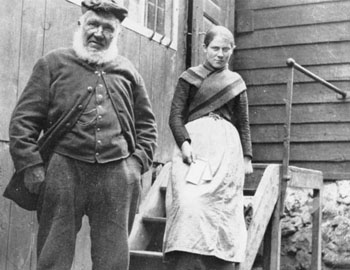
Maria Mikkelsen with Faroese politician Hans Christopher Müller

Maria Rebekka Mikkelsen (1877 – 1956) was a Danish writer and translator known for her contributions to Faroese language and literature.

She was born in Dalóastovu, Havn in 1877. Her father was a fisherman who died when she was young; her mother, Anna Catrina, was a contributor to the cultural magazine Varðan. At that time, the Faroese Society was making successful efforts to promote the Faroese language, so Mikkelsen learned it from her schoolteacher, Christian Ludvig Johannesen.

In the 1890s, (Note: While most sources say she moved to Denmark in 1898, Kvindebiografisk Leksikon has 1895.) she moved to Denmark to attend college. She worked in a bookshop, Høsts Boghandel, in Bredgade for about twenty years, and then worked at the Danish National Archives for 23 years from 1924.

A member of the board of the Copenhagen Faroese Association from 1911 to 1919, Mikkelsen became known for supporting Faroese students and writers in many unofficial capacities. She proofread Faroese books for publication and acted as a go-between for Faroese authors and publishing houses, especially supporting the work of A.C. Evensen and Jákup Dahl. She wrote biographical articles of fellow Faroese figures including Evensen, Maria Hammarshaimb, Rasmus Effersøe, Jóannes Patursson, and Janus Djurhuus.

Mikkelsen translated the works of German poet Heinrich Heine into Faroese. Among her original works are a poem, 'Tjaldursunga beyð hin lagna harða' (1913), about the experience of Faroese people travelling abroad for education, and a 'novel fragment', Fyri Fyrst (1945).

In 1947, she moved back to the Faroe Islands and lived in Reyn, Tórshavn until her death in 1956, upon which she donated her extensive book collection to the National Library of the Faroe Islands.
