= Governor Hansen =

Governor Hansen may refer to:

- Claus Hansen (died 1706), Governor of the Danish West Indies from 1702 to 1706
- Clifford Hansen (1912–2009), 26th Governor of Wyoming
