= Djóni í Geil =

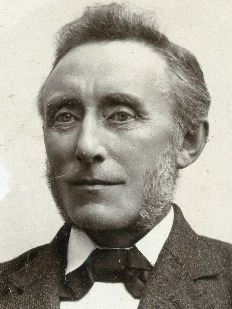
- Born: Djóni Isaksen; September 12, 1849; Tórshavn, Faroe Islands
- Died: April 20, 1912 (aged 62); Tórshavn, Faroe Islands

Djóni Isaksen (September 12, 1849 – April 20, 1912), also known as Djóni í Geil (Faroese pronunciation: [dʒɔunɪ ʊi gail]), was a Faroese craftsman, editor, and politician.

Isaksen was born in Tórshavn. He was a champion of Faroese independence, and he was one of the nine men that convened the Christmas Meeting of 1888. Djóni í Geil was elected to the Faroese Parliament as a representative from Suðurstreymoy for 1882–1885, 1887–1899 and 1901–1906. He was active in the temperance movement, among other things serving as the editor of the temperance newsletter Dúgvan from 1899 to 1907. He was also among those that established the newspaper Tingakrossur, and his son Christen Holm-Isaksen (a.k.a. Kristin í Geil, 1877–1935) became the paper's first editor in 1891.

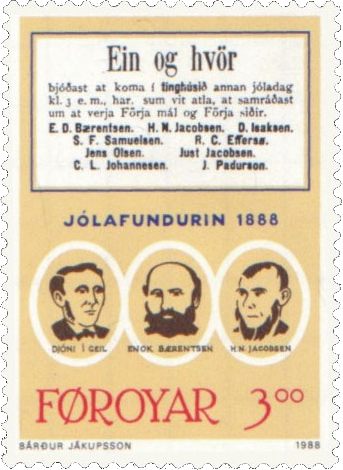
Faroese stamp featuring Djóni Isaksen / Djóni í Geil (1988)

In 1988, Djóni í Geil was featured on a Faroe Islands 3.00 króna stamp commemorating the 1888 Christmas Meeting.
