= Joachim Melchior von Holten =

Joachim Melchior Holten (17 March 1671 – 21 December 1708), also referred to as Jochum von Holten, was Governor of the Danish West Indies from 8 February 1706 to his death on 21 December 1708. He was the father-in-law of Johan Lorentz Castenschiold.

== Early life ==
Holten was born in Helsingør, the son of customs official (toldskriver) at Øresund Custom House Isbrandt van Holten (born 1685) and Anna Maria Bacher (born 9 April 1674).

== Career ==
Holten came to the Danish West Indies in the service of the Danish West India Company. In 1690, he served as bookkeeper on St. Thomas. On 15 December 1692, Thormøhlen appointed him as chief bookkeeper and merchant.

Upon John Lorentz' death on 19 February 1702, the planters named Claus Hansen as governor, whereas the colony officials decided upon Holten. However, the Danish West India Company sided with Hansen, and he was installed in office. Holten was installed as governor of the islands when Hansen died only four years later, on 8 February 1706. He remained in office until his own death in 1708. He was succeeded by Diderik Mogensen.

== Personal life ==
Holten married in 1692 in the Lutheran Church on St. Thomas to Maria van Beverhoudt, daughter of a local planter. Only one of their four daughters survived childhood. In 1694, Holten purchased a plantation on the east end of St. Thomas. They resided on the plantation in 1699 and 1700. They also maintained a residence in Charlotte Amalia in a house owned by Lucas van Beverhoudt.

Their daughter Jacoba v. Holten married planter Johan Lorentz Carstensen (later ennobled under the name Castenschiold). Their son Joachim Melchior Castenschiold was named after Holten.
