= Gabriel Milan =

Sephardic colonial administrator and planter

Factor
- In office 1668 (promoted to General Factor in 1670) – 7 May 1684

Governor of The Danish West Indies
- In office 7 May 1684 – declared 22 February 1686 (effective July 5, 1686)
- Preceded by: Adolph Esmit
- Succeeded by: Mikkel Mikkelsen

Personal details
- Born: c 1631 Glückstadt, Holy Roman Empire (now Germany)
- Died: March 26, 1689 Nytorv, Copenhagen, Denmark
- Spouse(s): 1st wife: Da Costa; 2nd wife: Juliane Regina von Breitenbach
- Children: 7, see The children of Gabriel Milan

Gabriel Milan (c. 1631 – 26 March 1689) was a colonial administrator and planter who served as governor of the Danish West Indies from 7 May 1684 to 27 February 1686. Though he mainly went by the name of 'Gabriel Milan', he identified himself as "Don Franco de Tebary Cordova" in his correspondence with King Frederick III of Denmark-Norway. Like many of the early Danish West Indies governors, Milan's term was short, as he disagreed with the Danish management on several issues. He was called to Denmark after less than two years and executed after a lengthy trial.

== Early life ==
Milan came from a reputable Sephardic Jewish family, likely from Spain, and had connections in Portugal, Flanders, and Hamburg. Some genealogists note that he is the son of Manuel Cardoso de Milão and Sara de Cáceres. At some point, his family was forced into a Catholic baptism, however, they had re-assumed their Jewish identity by the time of Milan's life.

Milan was first married to the daughter of Benjamin Musaphia, a Jewish scholar and author of a number of scientific works regarding archaeology, Semite philology, and alchemy. His wife's given name was not recorded in any sources, except that her last name was De Castro and her family's coat of arms depicting a moor's head. Thus, his family was related by marriage to the well-known Portuguese-Jewish houses of da Costa. Among the people connected to this family was Emanuel Teixiera Cardosa de Milan (also known as Isaac Haim Senior Teixeira – d. 1705), a wealthy merchant of the Portuguese Jewish community in Hamburg who was Milan's uncle by marriage. Another of Milan's uncles was Moseh Abenzur, a shipowner and jeweller who was also known by the names, Paulo de Milao, Milan, and Poul Didricksen. Moseh's oldest son, Josua Abenzur, was the brother-in-law of Milan and in his early dealings, Milan often borrowed money from Josua.

According to a letter to the King of Denmark, Milan begun his career as a soldier, notably as a colonel in the Spanish cavalry in Flanders (1654–55). He participated in the Thirty Years' War on the Spanish side against France in 1657, and fought at the Battle of Dunkerque. During this period, Milan was living in Brussels and later served under Cardinal Mazarin.

In 1667, Milan was an Amsterdam merchant, concerned with financing Prince George of Denmark. In 1668, he was made Danish Factor, and, in 1670, Factor-General in Amsterdam. In this capacity, Milan composed reports on political and commercial matters, which afforded him confidential relations with various important people at the Danish Court. By this time, Milan was corresponding in Spanish, French, Portuguese, German, and Dutch.

Milan's first wife died in 1675, leaving behind two children. Shortly thereafter, Milan married the widow Juliane Regina von Breitenbach. With Juliane, Milan had five children (see The children of Gabriel Milan).

By 1684, the affairs of St. Thomas were moving too swiftly for the comfort of the directors at Copenhagen. George Iversen, the first Governor of St. Thomas, recounted that he was forced to conform to Adolph Esmit and later, Esmit's older brother, Nicolai, and was held in his office until a new incumbent was secured. The patience of the English government was exhausted, and they had no interest in hearing Esmit's complaints. At a shareholders' meeting on March 10, the directors of the Danish company were asked to choose a new Governor.

Two candidates presented themselves, Balthasar Lachmann, who was an auditor, and Gabriel Milan. Milan was selected because for his linguistic knowledge and business ability. The recommendation, dated March 14, was signed by the executive committee of the directors, consisting of Albert Gyldensparre, a brother of the disgraced Count Griffenfeld; Abraham Wüst, later to become a member of the Board of Trade; and Edward Holst. On May 7, 1684, the King issued an order that deposed Adolph Esmit and named Gabriel Milan as Governor of St. Thomas.

== Governorship ==
To take the new governorship and his retinue over to the West Indies, the King set aside the warship Fortuna, armed with forty guns, and provided the ship with a crew of eighty men. Captain George Meyer, a German-speaking officer who was in the Danish-Norwegian service for five years, commanded the boat. Milan brought his family (his wife; his grown son, Felix; and his other four children), a governess, three maids, three lackeys and laborer, and a Tartar. The directors also sent Niels Lassen as Lieutenant Governor of sorts, and John Lorentz to serve as an assistant.

Lavish provisions were made for the Governor's comfort. Various foreign wines were on board, and place was found for six to seven dogs. The King furnished Milan with 6,000 rigsdaler (rdl) cash for Milan's immediate needs and gave him part of his salary in advance. Captain Meyer was entrusted with the secret order directing that, in case of Milan's death, Lassen would succeed him as the Governor. In case of Lassen's death, Lieutenant Christopher Heins of St. Thomas would take charge.

Milan tried in vain to get an appointment to the Board of Trade on the ground that he knew the tricks of traders and money-changers, and he accumulated a list of claims against his royal master for services rendered in the Netherlands—from espionage to loans of money—which he had small chance of collecting in cash. His prospects of getting into the employ of the state were improved when, on January 18, 1682, he secured a certificate showing that he had discussed with a Hamburg Lutheran minister the relative merits of Catholicism and Protestantism, and thereby become convinced of the truth of the Augsburg Confession, and partook of the Holy Communion. In depending upon the favor of princes, he had been forced, even before his appointment as Governor, to drink deep from the cup of misfortune. However praiseworthy the King's selection of this 53-year-old soldier of fortune for service in the company might have been from motives of humanity, his choice could scarcely have been looked upon by hard-headed business men with anything but misgivings.

The Fortuna arrived at St. Thomas on October 13, 1684, after a voyage of about nine weeks. At Nevis Milan called on October 6 to pay his respects to Governor Stapleton and to receive the latter's "instruction". Sir William seems to have availed himself of the opportunity to accompany Milan and to witness Adolph Esmit's final disgrace. Esmit handed over the reins of office without delay or resistance. He also handed over a treasury so empty that when the English were ready to depart, after having been entertained for ten days, the money needed for the purchase of parting gifts for English dignitaries had to be borrowed by the government from a planter. What was worst of all, Esmit handed over to Milan an island that had become an outlaw among its more reputable neighbors. This was shown clearly enough two months before the latter's arrival, when, on May 22, a Spanish captain, Antonio Martino, landed and carried fifty-six slaves off to Hispaniola or Haiti. Lieutenant Heins had been sent over with two planters to demand the return of the loot, but without success.

That Esmit had been prepared for the present contingency there could be no doubt. The gold, silver, and other property that he was able to scrape together had been sent to the Dutch island of St. Eustatius, whence they were to be shipped to Flushing. Although Milan had been instructed only to secure the persons of Esmit and his family and to have them sent to Copenhagen, he took it upon himself to try to secure the latter's property as well, by sending Niels Lassen to Governor Houtcooper of St. Eustatius with an alleged copy of his instructions and a demand for the delivery of the goods. But neither this nor subsequent attempts availed the crafty governor. Instead of seeking redress through diplomatic channels, as his masters expected him to do, he authorized Captain Delicaet to take the company's ship Charlotte Amalie (named after Charlotte Amalie of Hesse-Kassel or Hesse-Cassel), find the skipper who had transported the goods and make his ship lawful prize. It was to avoid just this sort of complication that Esmit had been displaced. But Milan was an exponent of direct action, he sought advice from none, and the council dared not oppose his will.

Instead of sending his deposed predecessor back to Copenhagen to answer for his stewardship over the company's affairs, and to act as defendant in a suit brought by his brother Nicholas, he clapped him into confinement, first keeping him at the fort as his guest, but later putting him in a prison cell. Madame Esmit had rightly decided that she could be more useful in Copenhagen than in St. Thomas and had started on her journey before Milan arrived. By this time, matters had grown rather beyond her power of control despite all her influential friends and her genius for intrigue, so she confined herself to taking measures to save what she could of the family property. She returned to St. Thomas in December to share the hardships of prison life with her husband.

The story of how Governor Milan, his sick body racked with fever almost from the first, restlessly suspicious and ofttimes with reason of his fellow men, jealous of his official power and position, administered the affairs of St. Thomas during his sixteen months' incumbency may be dealt with rather briefly. In Captain Meyer's attempt to provide the Fortuna, with a good return cargo, the governor took but an indifferent interest, and as to the Esmits' returning on the Fortuna, he would have none of it. Just why he should deliberately keep with him persons who could not but be a source of trouble as long as they were near, is difficult to explain on other grounds than cupidity. Milan had been unable to lay his hands on Esmit's gains. In his relations with his council, he showed his arbitrariness and wilfulness. In place of Lieutenant Heins, who happened to be absent on the company's business when Milan arrived, the governor promptly appointed his son, Felix. Instead of selecting permanent councilors from among the planters as he had been instructed to do under certain specified conditions, he put in now one, now another, until fourteen planters had taken part in the government with him.

With the other planters Milan was equally whimsical. For trifling misdemeanors, he instituted elaborate investigations and meted out extravagant fines and punishments where a wiser man would have overlooked the whole matter. Offending slaves were made to feel the pressure of the governor's heavy hand. A runaway who might have been mercifully beheaded was impaled alive on a sharpened stick to die in horrible agony. Another slave, arrested on a similar charge, had his foot cut off, after which he was confiscated to the governor's use and put to work in his kitchen.

When in the spring following the departure of the Fortuna (on March 31, 1685), Milan got wind of what he at once suspected to be a nefarious plot against his life, he vented his fury upon the unfortunate persons with swift and fiendish vengeance. In the midst of charges and counter-charges, one fact stood out with a clearness that was unmistakable. Milan's stewardship of his own plantation property was above reproach; seventy slaves remained on the plantation even after twenty-five had been returned to an Englishman from whom they had been forcibly seized. Here prosperity was rife.

In Copenhagen, Captain Meyer's arrival was naturally awaited with a good deal of interest, even anxiety. The captain's report when he arrived on June 10, 1685, without Adolph Esmit, and even without a word from Milan, gave the directors and shareholders food for thought. Although they had only the captain's unsupported word, the small cargo and Milan's silence could not but rouse their fears that something was seriously wrong at St. Thomas. A meeting of the company's shareholders was held within two days, and it was decided that the situation was serious enough to justify sending a memorial to the king asking once more for the loan of the Fortuna, and for the sending thence of a commissioner with power to settle all the difficulties. They suggested an attorney or fiscal in the navy department, Mikkel Mikkelsen. The king could do nothing but fall in with the company's recommendations.

Commissioner Mikkelsen, armed with full power, left Copenhagen on the Fortuna October 15, 1685, touched at Nevis on February 19 to get the latest St. Thomas advices, and arrived at his destination on February 24, 1686. The governor's son, Ferdinand, had already sent his father a warning from Copenhagen that it was planned to send out a new governor, namely, Captain Meyer, whom the governor had blamed for most of his misfortunes, even his illness. Milan, whose nerves had scarcely recovered from the shock of the "conspiracy," called the planters together in the "German" church. There he informed them of this last "conspiracy," namely, the attempt to place this "rascal" Mikkelsen in the governor's seat "whom he ought to be hanged to the highest tree.". He counselled resistance, exhorted their aid, and by cajolings and threats secured their signatures to a document by which they pledged themselves to leave the land before they would see their governor leave them.

But if he proposed to give battle, he needed to secure the sinews of war. He chose a method consistent with his nature. On February 17, 1686, just as the royal commissioner was approaching the West Indian Waters, the governor authorized Captain Daniel Moy to take the company's ship, Charlotte Amalia, and cruise upon the Spaniards wherever they might be of thirty men; Captain Moy put to sea to make war upon the kingdom of Spain. The Charlotte Amalia had no difficulty in finding a Spanish ship on the Porto Rico coast, but the latter vessel had the temerity to answer Captain Moy's fire, wounding one man, killing another, and forcing the valiant captain to beat a nasty retreat to St. Thomas. It was withal an inglorious ending to a sorry enterprise, and not calculated to redeem the good name of the island.

The commissioners had arrived in the harbor before the news of the "reprisal" fiasco could reach the governor, and before his "valet", Moses Caille, could return from the French islands, whence he had been sent by the desperate governor in search of help. Sitting in his private room and surrounded by all manner of firearms, the governor drew the parley out for three days before he finally surrendered to the king's representative. Mikkelsen's intimation that Milan's attitude rendered him liable to the charge of rebellion, combined with the fact that the men on whom he could depend were rapidly diminishing in number, brought the governor to his knees. A guard consisting of twelve men from the Fortuna and twelve planters, all under the command of Christopher Heins, was placed at the fort. With his removal to the ship, the reign of Gabriel Milan came to a sudden end. Adolph Esmit and his wife, Charity, likewise the company's merchant, Niels Lassen, who had been in prison since April 30, were taken out of their dungeons and put on board ship. The scene of interest, as far as the company is concerned, was soon to shift to Copenhagen. Nicholas Esmit had already lost his wits while in a Copenhagen prison waiting for a chance to clear himself and to bring action against his brother. The two successors of Nicholas were now to be given a chance to defend their official actions in the Danish courts and before the directors of the company.

Commissioner Mikkelsen was employed from March until July with collecting evidence from the planters concerning Milan's conduct. A few extracts from a letter written by the official reporter, Andrew Brock, to director Albert Gyldensparre on June 30, 1686, just before the Fortuna sailed, will give an idea of the proceedings. "I wish for my part that your Excellency could have been here a single day and heard what thundering there has been in the commission, with howling, shouting, and screaming, one against the other, and I had to write it into the protocol just as fast [as they spoke] . . . but God be thanked it is over, and former Lieutenant Christopher Heins was yesterday made governor and vice commandant here. May God in heaven aid him to carry on his government better than his predecessors, which I expect him to do, as he has shown himself only as an honest and upright man. . . . "

Milan himself dictated a letter to the directors in justification of his conduct in which he vented his wrath on those inhabitants and employees who had attested to his zeal and faithfulness, but were now shouting, "Crucify him, crucify him!" The letters of the two prisoners, Esmit and Lassen, which were sent over at the same time, bore out on the whole the testimony of the planters, whose sympathies were on the side of those two victims of Milan's wrath.

== Trial and death ==
Mikkelsen left St. Thomas with his rather uncongenial company on July 5, and did not arrive in Copenhagen until October 12, 1686. Besides the two governors with their families and enslaved servants, the list of passengers included Niels Lassen, Gerhart Philipsen, and John Lorentz, whose testimony was desired in the suits. A commission was appointed within a week to try the case against Milan, but delays in getting the tangled evidence straightened prevented a decision being reached before November 17, 1687. An appeal to the Supreme Court brought further delays, but finally the case was opened on February 14, 1689. The judges rendered their individual opinions on March 14, and judgment was finally pronounced on March 21. The sentence was reported to be not a surprise to those who had followed the case. After an allegedly (by 17th century standards, as anti-Semitism was rampant in Denmark as the first Jewish community in Denmark was only 'permitted' to be established in 1682 see History of the Jews in Denmark) impartial trial Gabriel Milan was found guilty and condemned to lose his property, honor, and life, and his head and hand were to be put upon a stake. A royal pardon saved him from the last grim disgrace, and at dawn on March 26, 1689, he was beheaded on Nytorv Square in Copenhagen.

== Succession ==
Adolph Esmit's long imprisonment both on St. Thomas and in Copenhagen in 1686 and 1687 had given him grounds for appearing as the injured party, and for demanding some form of restitution. While the Milan trial was dragging slowly on, the former governor and his wife seemed to have been kept in prison in Copenhagen. From their arrival on October 12, 1686, until March, 1687, when Nicholas' case against his brother was finally ready for trial, they remained in confinement. Here, as in the case of Milan, a commission was appointed, and although a number of petty irregularities and cases of tampering with accounts were found, Adolph Esmit was on November 2, 1687, given a verdict of not guilty.

On the same day, the directors of the company named him governor of St. Thomas, A few days later a fleet of three ships, the Young Tobias, the Red Cock (Den Røde Hane) and the Maria left Copenhagen for the West Indies. Accompanying Adolph Esmit, and in command of the fleet, was vice-admiral Iver Hoppe who seems to have had secret orders to being Esmit back with him to Denmark in case he proved intractable.

In 1689, the governor and council proposed that a sugar mill should be put up on Milan's former plantation, and ventured the opinion that if sugar cane should prove successful on the company's plantations, it would prove more profitable than cotton or tobacco.

Preceded by Adolph Esmit	Governor of the Danish West Indies; 1684–1686	Succeeded by Mikkel Mikkelsen (ad interim)

== The children of Gabriel Milan ==
After the execution of Gabriel Milan, his second wife stayed in Denmark with some of the children. She was granted 100 rdl. by the crown, as she had lost all.

1. By Unknown de Castro (?–1675), the daughter of Benjamin Musaphia.
  1. Felix Milan (<1658– >1689) possibly in Brussels. Was on Milan's council during his governance. Probably left Denmark after Gabriel Milan's execution.
  2. Frantz Ferdinand Milan (1658– >1687) in Brussels (possibly Amsterdam). At differing times lieutenant in the Danish, Dutch and Swedish armies. Later life unknown.
2. By Juliana Regina von Breitenbach (? – September, 1698), a widow, likely born in the Netherlands. Died in Denmark.
  1. Carl Friderich Milan (ca. 1676–1738) in Amsterdam. Died in Copenhagen, Denmark. Painter.
    1. By Anna Marie Kesler (February 14, 1676 – November 25, 1730).
      1. Gabriel Ferdinand Milan (ca. 1700 – November 1777) in Copenhagen, Denmark. Died in Helsingør, Denmark where he was court gilder and vicemayor.
      2. Casper Felix Milan (ca. 1701– >1730) in Copenhagen.
      3. Juliana Regina Milan (ca. 1709– >1754) died in Norway (possibly Frederiksværn).
      4. Friderich Carl Milan (November 20, 1711 – September 8, 1787) in Fyn, Denmark. Court painter and court guilder.
      5. Anna Christiana Dorothea Milan: (June 22, 1717 – December 2, 1752) in Copenhagen, Denmark.
  2. Christian Ulrich Milan, lived in Copenhagen 1698, probably died young.
  3. Conrad Adam Milan (ca. 1676 – 1684) in the West Indies.
  4. Unknown Milan (July 1686 - ca. 1686), a son, born on board the ship between the West Indies and Denmark, died as an infant.
  5. Charlotta Isabella Milan (?– ca. 1685) in St. Thomas.

== Bibliography ==
- Janus Fredrik Krarup, Gabriel Milan og Somme af hans Samtid in Personalhistorisk Tidsskrift, 3 R. 2 B. (Kjöbenhavn, 1893), 102–130, and 3 R. 3 B. (1894), 1-51.
- Zvi Locker, 'Yehūdīm Sfāraddīm b-tafqīdīm dīplōmaṭiyyīm' ('Sefāraddī Jews in diplomatic rôles'). Sheveṭ w-'ām 5.10 (October 1984): 136–141.
- H. C. Terslin, Guvernør over Dansk Vestindien Gabriel Milan og hans Efterkommere (Helsingør, 1926)
- Waldemar Westergaard, The Danish West Indies under Company Rule (1671 - 1754) (MacMillan, New York, 1917)
