= Oliver Effersøe =

Faroese official and politician (1863–1933)

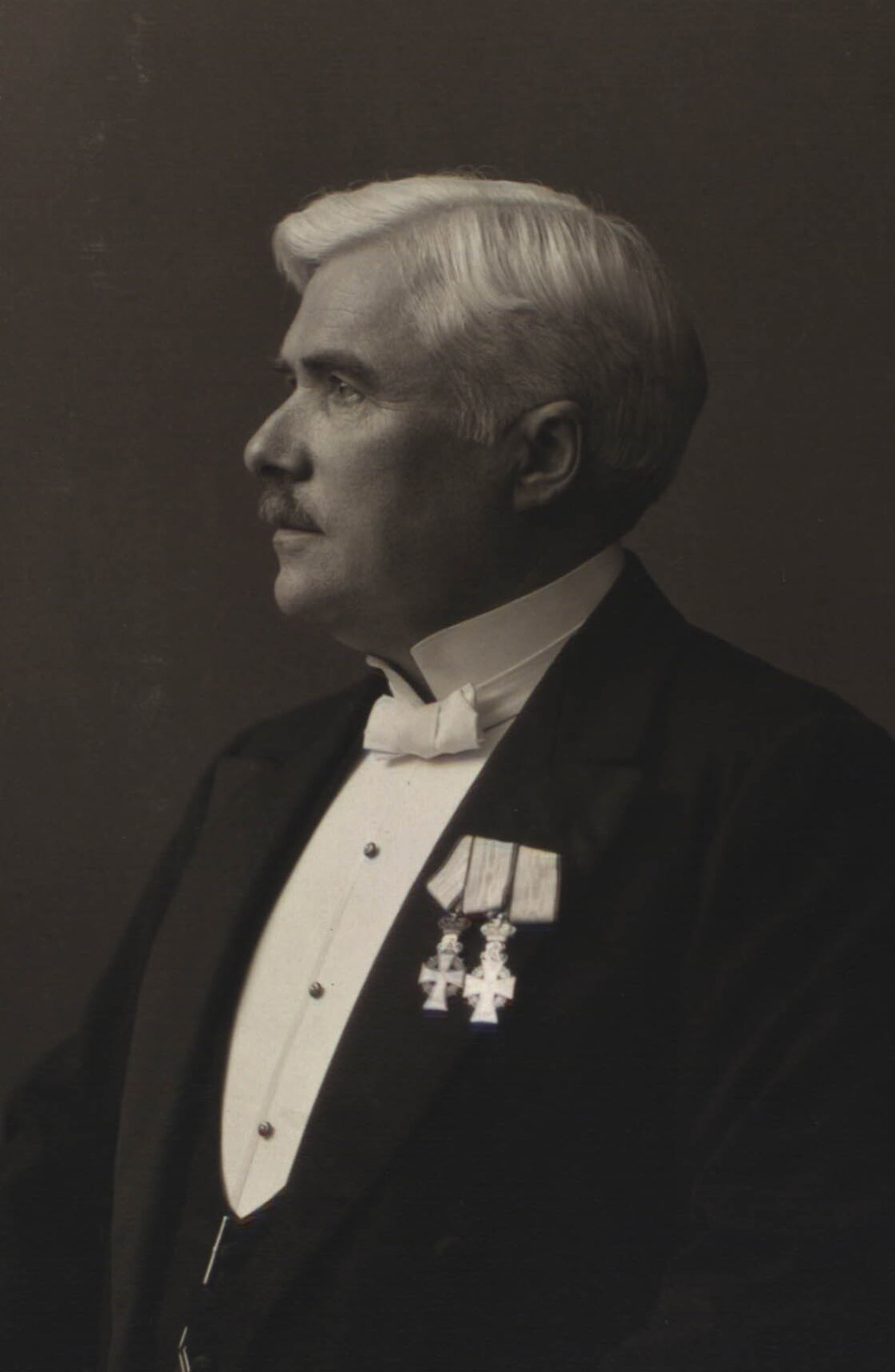
Oliver Effersøe.

Oliver Johan Thomas Ludvig Effersøe (March 20, 1863 – March 8, 1933) was a Faroese official and politician for the Faroese Union Party.

Effersøe was born in Tvøroyri. His surname comes from the Icelandic island of Effersey (Old Norse Örfirisey 'island of the ebb tide'). He was the son of the local administrator (sysselmann) Gudmund Christie Laurentius Isholm Effersøe and the brother of the agronomist, poet, and politician Rasmus Effersøe (1857–1916) and the lawyer Poul Effersøe (1871–1926).

He received his candidate of law degree from the University of Copenhagen in 1882, and then served on Suðuroy as a deputy local administrator from 1883 to 1894 and as a local administrator from 1894 to 1920. He was a council member in the Municipality of Froðba (Froðbiar kommuna; now the Municipality of Tvøroyri, Tvøroyrar kommuna) from 1888 to 1905, and mayor of the municipality from 1889 to 1905. Effersøe also served as a postal official in Trongisvágur from 1883 to 1905, as a board member of the bank Færø Amts Sparekasse from 1918 to 1923, and as the claims commissioner for Suðuroy from 1894 to 1905. Effersøe was also very active in the temperance movement and he worked as a politician for prohibition in the Faroe Islands.

Effersøe was a member of the Faroese Parliament for Suðuroy in 1889–1893, 1900–1901, and 1905–1931. He excused himself from his duties in 1931 because of illness. Effersøe was one of the founders of the Union Party and he represented the party for the rest of his time in the Faroese Parliament. Effersøe was the leader of the party from 1917 to 1924, and he also served as speaker of the Faroese Parliament from 1924 to 1928 and from 1930 to 1932. In addition, he was active in the Danish Parliament's lower house (the Folketing) as a Faroese representative from 1906 to 1913, and in the upper house (the Landsting) in 1914–1915, 1920–1928, and 1929–1933. He was the first politician affiliated with the Left Reform Party (Venstrereformpartiet) in the Danish Parliament, renamed the Left (Venstre) in 1909.

Effersøe died Charlottenlund, Denmark.
