= Johan Lorensen =

Danish colonial administrator

Johan Lorensen (died 1702) was a Danish colonial administrator who twice served as governor of the Danish West Indies from October 1689 to 17 September 1692 and 7 April 1693 to 19 February 1702. Little is known about his career or personal life outside his governorship in the West Indies.

== Biography ==
=== Early life ===
Lorensen was born in Flensburg, Denmark. He first arrived on the St. Thomas along with Gabriel Milan in 1684, having contracted to serve the Danish West India Company for four years. However, in 1686, he was back in Denmark, to testify in the trial against Milan, who was under scrutiny due to his gubernatorial rule.

In 1688, Lorensen returned with Adolph Esmit to the West Indies, as bookkeeper and assistant. For this, his wage was 14 Danish rigsdaler per month. Upon Christopher Heins' death in October 1689, Lorensen was elected governor.

=== Governorship ===
The death of vice-governor Heins in October 1689, and the election of John Lorentz to take his place, did not improve the position of the Brandenburgisch-Africanische Compagnie on the islands nor the relations between them and the Danish West India Company. Within a fortnight after his election Lorentz issued an order forbidding the Brandenburgers to bring any privateers or prizes into St. Thomas harbor. This was in strict accordance with paragraph 35 of the treaty, and with Denmark's neutral position in the King William's War, which was just beginning; hence it could not reasonably be objected to; but when on 7 November he issued a mandate forbidding the Danish inhabitants from buying any wares from the Brandenburgers' magazine that could be found in stock at the Danish company's warehouse, and further forbade the payment of debts to the Brandenburgers until the debts to the Company had been satisfied, there was reason for the Brandenburgers to feel apprehensive. The most trifling complaint against the rival company became the subject of solemn investigation by the zealous governor. Brandenburger director M. Laporte naturally looked towards the planters for moral support. They had two representatives in the Governor's council and would expect to benefit from the presence of two rival companies on the island. The result was that government and colony were soon divided into two rival camps, each affecting to suspect the worst of the other.

==== Life lease ====
On 27 July 1689 a life lease was granted to Nicholas Jansen Arff, by which he secured the right to use Fort Christiansborg, the Danish "castle" on the Guinea coast, and to carry on the slave trade with the West Indies, on the payment to the Company of a "two per cent" duty. This was followed on 13 February 1690 by a contract with a reputable and venturesome Bergen merchant, Councilor of Commerce (Commerce-Raad) Jørgen Thormöhlen of Möhlenpriis, who leased St. Thomas from the Company for a period of ten years. He was to pay 4,630 sldl. each year, which was just four per cent. of the 115,750 sldl. capital entered on the books of the Company. By these two contracts the management of both the Guinea and West India ends of the Company's business went into the hands of private proprietors.

==== Controversy ====
Before the news of these changes could be received at St. Thomas, and before Lorentz had received a request from Thormöhlen to remain at his post until further orders, the vice-governor was preparing to bring the matter of the contested land rental to a definite settlement in the Company's favor, if necessary, by force. He was proceeding according to secret instructions from the directors in Copenhagen. The rental which was calculated upon the current price of tobacco was estimated at 20,000 rdl. annually, that is, more than six times the rental fixed in the Thormöhlen contract. If strictly enforced it would spell ruin, which was apparently precisely what was intended.

On St. Thomas, an atmosphere of suspicion pervaded everything. On the last day of October Lorentz declined an invitation to a banquet given by director-general Laporte, for he felt that it was to be merely a meeting of Laporte's adherents among the planters, --- his "creatures." Among those suspected of disloyalty to the Danish company were two members of the governor's council, Captain Delicaet and Lawrence Westerbaen, the latter a refugee from St. Eustatius. Every remark of these men that might possibly be unfavorably construed was carefully noted by Lorentz in his diary. At a meeting of the council called by the governor with a view to ascertaining how these men stood, Captain Delicaet was quoted as having declared: "It is a difficult matter, for we have to do, not with common people, but with lords and princes." The governor informed his significantly that he would know well enough what was prosper to do when the time for the payment approached. Among the planters the governor worked cautiously, drawing the loyal ones among them still more closely to his side. He was fully determined to be prepared "in case any should be inclined to rebellion."

==== Taxes ====
The time limit for the payment of the tax according to Lorentz's calculations was 23 November, so on the 24th the latter called the council together again and had an itemized bill prepared for 20,000 rdl. 46½ styvers. This bill together with a letter was taken by the two professedly loyal councilors to Laporte on 25 November. Two days later the director-general came before the council to read his reply in which he stated his reasons for refusing payment. The main argument advanced was that he had no orders from his chiefs to make any such payment. After Laporte's departure the council decided, in view of the expected arrival on any day of three Brandenburg ships, to institute judicial condemnatory proceedings after three days' elapse. Finally, on 2 December (O.S.), 1690, came the day of reckoning, when the vice-governor and his council marched over to the Brandenburg warehouse, with the Company's smith to break the lock, and a committee of inhabitants, mainly planters, to appraise the condemned goods. On Laporte's refusal to accede to the council's formal demand to open the magazine and after vigorous protests and appeals by the Brandenburgers the doors were forcibly opened and the appraisal begun. Lorentz carefully notes in his journal Laporte's remark to Delicaet and Berentsen that "if they (the Brandenburgers) were as strong in the land as we (the Danes) we should not have done what we did." He quotes this as an evidence of their "good(!) intentions" and of "what they had up their sleeves." By Christmas Eve, two of the Brandenburg warehouses had practically been empties of all their sugar and cotton. The value was estimated by the director-general at 24,652 pieces-of-eight, remarkable precision, considering that he had refused to send a representative to participate in the weighing.

==== Seizure ====
The seizure was not carried out without a certain danger to the colony. Meetings were held on the quiet at the houses of various planters, and were attended by the Brandenburg officials. At some of these gatherings anti-Company indignation found vent. Thomas Berentsen, one of Lorentz's most trusted councilors, who tried to investigate one of these meetings, found Laporte and all the Brandenburg employees there as well as an English captain from st. Kitts, one "Callehan" and several planters. Laporte himself forced Berentsen out through the door, uttered sundry threats against the Danes and accused him of being one of the demons of the Brandenburgers. The proposal to seize the Brandenburg houses and slaves was considered by the vice-governor and council, but was finally dropped as inexpedient.

Three Brandenburg ships, the frigates Electoral Prince and Salamander, and a snow arrived in St. Thomas Harbor on 7 March, having on board about four hundred men, and provided with a commission to seize French ships. The arrival of the three vessels set numerous rumors afloat concerning their intentions, but their passports had been issued on 18 August preceding, over three months before the seizure of the sugar and cotton, hence any action they might have taken would have been entirely upon the authority of the captains and the St. Thomas officials of their company. As it was, Laporte confined himself to repeating his request for restitution of the confiscated goods and to making an offer of forty marines to supplement the weak garrison at the fort, both of which overtures were firmly but politely declined by Lorentz. The latter even sent in a further claim of his own for the balance of the rental, his estimated falling considerably short of that of the director-general. The vessels left in a little over a month with only a part of the expected cargoes.

Meanwhile, a Brandenburg bark had left St. Thomas on 8 January to carry the news of the Danish company's violence to Emden and Berlin. With that the scene of interest shifts from St. Thomas to Copenhagen, whither by June the Brandenburg envoy Pierre de Falaiseau had betaken himself to demand on behalf of his master the recall of Lorentz and the punishment of the guilty parties. Christian V hastened to send a letter to Lorentz (20 June) asking for an explanation and for the necessary documents. When in September the news came that Lorentz had seized the Electoral Princess and her cargo of slaves new force was added to the former complaint, and to persons outside of official circles it began to look as if the Esmit-Milan drama was to be acted over again in a revised version with Laporte in Stapleton's role.

==== Delays ====
The distance and the slowness of communication between the home government and the West Indian factories were bound to delay final action many months. The problem for the Danish government was no easy one, for it was forced officially to disavow the violence of its representative who had been guilty of nothing worse than carrying out the orders of the Company's directors. The loosely drawn provisions in the treaty of 1685 were the main obstacles to satisfactory settlement. As the Elector's envoy Falaiseau and his colleague expressed it, "if M. Raule had drawn up a clearer contract, he would have spared us considerable trouble, but it is all over now." The exigencies of the war had nevertheless forced the two states to consider a closer alliance, so a temporary settlement of the St. Thomas difficulties was hastily concluded on 11/21 April and ratified by Christian V on 23 April (O.S.), 1692. A supplementary agreement of 10/20 June fixed the mode in which payment should be carried out. It was arranged that the seized goods, the value of which was fixed at 16,000 rdl., should be restored to the Brandenburg company with such other seizures of ships or goods as might have been made thereafter; and that for the next three years the Brandenburg African Company should pay 3,000 rdl. annually in lieu of all other sums due or claimed, the sum to be paid yearly to the Danish company through the Hamburg bank.

==== Difficulties ====
The difficulties with the Danish authorities at St. Thomas had led the Brandenburg government to make renewed efforts to secure an independent foothold in the West Indies. Again they tried to take possession of Crab Island, but when the Brandenburg party arrived there on 19 December 1692 they found the Danes already on the ground and their Dannebrog banner defiantly waving above them. John Lorentz, who continued in off ad interim until the proprietor Thormöhlen could provide a governor, had sent a captain with some men to Crab Island a few days before the Brandenburg bark made its landing. Though Laporte spread rumors threatening forcible seizure of the island, no further serious efforts were made in that direction. The Tobago negotiations were renewed and a treaty made with Duke Frederick Casimir who had only recently married the Elector Frederick's sister, Elizabeth Sophie; but England still refused to give up her claims to the island. St. Eustatius likewise came in for attempts. The French had captured it from the Dutch in 1689, but had been forced in 1690 to surrender it to the English, who in turn delivered it up to the Dutch in 1692. The English were naturally unwilling to give up an island originally belonging to an ally; and of course the Dutch had no desire to surrender their most valuable slave trading factory in the Leeward Islands.

==== Death ====
Lorensen died in 1702. According to Knox, "he was a worthy and faithful officer, and his death was much regretted, both by the company and Mr. Thormøhlen, into whose plans he had warmly entered. His salary had been only four hundred rix-dollars, with perquisites, no doubt, appertaining to his office."

Note that Knox also claims Lorensen was alive in 1707 when St. Thomas was visited by Père Labat. It is likely that the correct year is 1701, as Labat was only in the West Indies from 1694 to 1706.

== Bibliography ==
- John P. Knox, A Historical Account of St. Thomas (Charles Schribner, New York, 1852). Online edition available
- Waldemar Westergaard, The Danish West Indies under Company Rule (1671–1754) (MacMillan, New York, 1917)

Political offices
Preceded by Christopher Heins (ad interim)	Governor of the Danish West Indies (ad interim); 1689– 1692	Succeeded by Frans de la Vigne
Preceded by Frans de la Vigne	Governor of the Danish West Indies (ad interim); 1693–1702	Succeeded by Claus Hansen
