= Benjamin Musaphia =

Jewish doctor, scholar and kabbalist

Benjamin ben Immanuel Musaphia (c. 1606 – 1675), also called Benjamin Musaphia, Binyamin Moussafia or Mussafia and Dionysius, was a Jewish doctor, scholar and kabbalist.

Musaphia was probably born in Spain. He married Sara Abigail da Silva, daughter of Semuel da Silva, in 1628. Their sons and grandsons joined the court of the Gottorps, and a daughter was married to Gabriel Milan, who would later be appointed governor of the Danish West Indies (now the United States Virgin Islands). Around this time, Musaphia graduated from the University of Padua medical school, which was regarded as the best of its kind at the time.

He was a Hebrew lexicographer and philologist.

== Publications ==
After Sara's death on 7 August 1634, Musaphia dedicated Zekher Rav, an adaptation of the creation myth in which all Hebrew word roots are used exactly once, to her. It was first published in Amsterdam, Netherlands, in 1635, and a second edition with a Latin translation was published in Hamburg in 1638.

Another work was published in 1640, namely Sacro-Medicæ Sententiæ ex Bibliis, a medical treatise containing about 800 sentences on medicine. It contained a section on alchemy that created some stirring at the time. Musaphia also dedicated a work on ebb and flow to Christian IV of Denmark in 1642.

== Career ==
In 1646, while living in Glückstadt, Holstein, Musaphia was appointed royal physician to the Danish court by Christian IV.

Around 1648, probably in connection with the death of Christian IV, Musaphia went to Amsterdam and joined the college of rabbis. In 1655, he published an extended version of Nathan ben Jehiel's Talmudic dictionary Aruk (ca. 1100), titled Musaf he-'Aruk, detailing many Jewish customs. The preface states that he had been collecting this information since a young boy. Musaphia was also working on a commentary of the Talmud in 1702, which was never published, and the manuscripts have since been lost.

He is described by Heinrich Graetz as a semi-Spinozist. He wrote a letter of homage to Sabbatai Zevi on his declaration of being the messiah. He became an enthusiastic advocate of the Sabbatean movement. His work was discussed by Jacques Basnage and Menahem Amelander, the latter of whom including the fact that his commentary on the Gemara Yerushalmi had not been published as of 1741.

He is said to have assisted Spinoza with his return or repentance to Judaism.

He also researched the ocean tides.

== Personal life and family ==
His brother Albert Dionis was one of the wealthiest Jews in Hamburg in 1614.

Musaphia died in 1675, in Amsterdam.

== Sources ==
- H. C. Terslin, Guvernør over Dansk Vestindien Gabriel Milan og hans Efterkommere (Helsingør, 1926)
- Hauch-Fausbøll, Jødernes Færden og Ophold i den Danske State i 17. Aarh. (Tidsskrift for Jødisk Historie og Literratur II)
- Meyer Kayserling, Jødernes Historie
- J. Margolinsky, Benjamin Musaphia (Tidsskrift for Jødisk Historie og Literratur III)
