= Christopher Heins =

Governor of the Danish West Indies

Christopher Heins (died October 1689) was a lieutenant and interim Governor-General of The Danish West Indies during two short periods, respectively 29 June 1686 to March 1687 and from October 1688 to 1689. Little is known about his career or personal life outside his reigns under company rule.

When Gabriel Milan was appointed governor in 1684, Heins accompanied him to the West Indies, and would succeed him in the event of his death (after Niels Lassen who was the direct successor).

When Milan's rule fell into disfavor with the Danish administration in 1686 and he was removed from office, he gave the charge of the fortress to Heins. However, Mikkel Mikkelsen of the Danish party was the official governor until 29 June 1686 when official charge of the islands was given to Heins.

The official reporter, Andrew Brock, said about the incidents (in a letter to Albert Gyldensparre): "May God in heaven aid him (Heins) oto carry on his government better than his predecessors, which I expect him to do, as he has shown himself only as an honest and upright man."

After the initial confusion of the Milan deposition, Adolph Esmit was reinstated as governor in 1687, leaving Heins as vice-governor. However, this rule was short, as the company quickly found that Esmit was unable to fulfill his obligations in a satisfactory manner, and he was recalled to Denmark the year after.

Vice-admiral Ivar Hoppe who was taking Esmit back called the inhabitants together on 8 July 1688 and told them that he wished to know if Esmit’s statement that he held the affection of all on the island was true. "If you want Adolph Esmit to become governor, speak now while there is yet time," the vice-admiral said. To this the planters all responded as with one voice, “No! if that should happen, we should all leave the land!” When asked concerning vice-governor Heins, they replied that they asked for no better governor. Heins was reinstated as governor ad interim in October of that year.

This reign would be short, however, as he died only a year after.

| Preceded by Mikkel Mikkelsen (ad interim) | Governor of the Danish West Indies (ad interim); 1686–1687 | Succeeded by Adolph Esmit |
| Preceded by Adolph Esmit | Governor of the Danish West Indies (ad interim); 1688–1689 | Succeeded by Johan Lorensen |

== Bibliography ==
- Waldemar Westergaard, The Danish West Indies under Company Rule (1671–1754) (MacMillan, New York, 1917).
