= Mikkel Mikkelsen =

Danish West Indies politician

Mikkel Mikkelsen (also called Michael) was Governor-General ad interim of St. Thomas in the Danish West Indies, from 27 February 1686 to 29 June 1686. Little is known about his life, aside from his short term as Governor during the turbulent early days of company rule.

When the rule of Gabriel Milan, and his imprisonment of former Governor Adolph Esmit had become a problem for the Danish West India Company in 1686, it was decided that Mikkelsen was to be sent as a commissioner to settle the difficulties.

Mikkelsen left Copenhagen on 15 October 1685, arriving fully armed on 24 February 1686 on board the same Fortuna that had brought Milan to St. Thomas. In the meantime, Milan, warned from Copenhagen by his son Ferdinand, had secured (or "cajoled" as Westergaard puts it) the plantationers of St. Thomas into putting up resistance against Mikkelsen, the "rascal".

A three-day parley followed, as Mikkelsen attempted to negotiate with an armed Milan. Finally, after making it clear to Milan that his actions could cause him to be held liable for rebellion, and that his men were leaving him, Mikkelsen managed to talk him to returning to Copenhagen.

Esmit and his wife, along with others of Milan's prisoners were extracted from the prison and boarded the Fortuna along with Milan.

Mikkelsen's task was now to collect evidence of Milan's misconduct for the trial in Copenhagen, and acted as de facto Governor of the island from this day. According to exchanges with West India Company Director Albert Gyllensparre, the proceedings were quite heated, as both Esmit and Milan would accuse each other, shouting and screaming.

On 29 June 1686, they started making preparations to return to Copenhagen, and Christopher Heins was inserted as Governor-General. The Fortuna left St. Thomas on 5 July 1686, and arrived in Copenhagen on 12 October 1686, where the trial started almost immediately.

== Bibliography ==
- Waldemar Westergaard, The Danish West Indies under Company Rule (1671 - 1754) (MacMillan, New York, 1917)

Political offices
Preceded by Gabriel Milan	Governor of the Danish West Indies; 1686	Succeeded by Christopher Heins (ad interim)
