= 1889 Faroese general election =

Danish territorial election

Partial general elections were held in the Faroe Islands in 1889 to elect nine of the eighteen elected members of the Løgting. The Danish administrator (Amtmaður) and the local dean (Próstur) were also members, with the administrator serving as the speaker.

== Electoral system ==
Members of the Løgting were elected by first-past-the-post voting, with voters having as many votes as there were seats available in their constituency. Nine of the 18 seats were elected every two years. Voting was restricted to men aged 25 or over who met certain tax-paying criteria.

== Results ==
Constituency	Elected members	Notes
Norðoyggjar	Jens Christian Djurhuus	Re-elected
Norðoyggjar	Klæmint Olsen	Re-elected
Sandoy	Ole Johannessen	
Sandoy	Poul Poulsen	Re-elected
Suðuroy	Oliver Effersøe	
Suðuroy	Johan Hendrik Schrøter	Re-elected
Suðurstreymoy	Christian Andreas Hansen	
Suðurstreymoy	Hans Christopher Müller	Re-elected
Suðurstreymoy	Andreas William Restorff	
Source: Løgting
