= Poul Effersøe =

Poul Effersøe (January 24, 1871 – March 11, 1926) was a Faroese lawyer.

Effersøe was born in Trongisvágur. His surname comes from the Icelandic island of Effersey (Old Norse Örfirisey 'island of the ebb tide'). He was the son of the local administrator (sysselmann) Gudmund Christie Laurentius Isholm Effersøe and the brother of the agronomist, poet, and politician Rasmus Effersøe (1857–1916) and the politician Oliver Effersøe (1863–1933).

He received the degree of examen artium from Sorø Academy in 1889 and became a candidate of law in 1897. Effersøe served as a representative for the governor of Bornholm from 1897 to 1898, and then worked under superior court barrister Frederik Phister (1898–1899) and under superior court barrister Sophus Sinding (1899–1901). Because of illness, he was unable to work for several years, and he resided in the Faroe Islands. He started practicing as an unlicensed lawyer in Tórshavn in 1905. In 1914 he became a superior court barrister.

Effersøe died in Tórshavn.
