= Hans Andrias Djurhuus =

Faroese poet and teacher

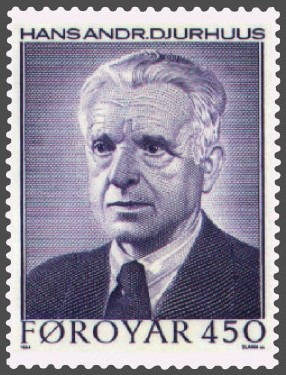
Djurhuus on a Faroese stamp from 1984

Hans Andrias Djurhuus (20 October 1883 – 6 May 1951) was a Faroese poet and teacher. Hans Andrias Djurhuus was one of the most productive Faroese poets. He is well known for his national poems and for his children's songs, but he also wrote psalms, short stories, plays, fairytales and one novel.

== Biography ==
Djurhuus was born and died in Tórshavn. His brother Janus Djurhuus, who was two years older, is also one of the well-known poets of the Faroe Islands. He also had an older sister called Armgarð Maria Djurhuus, which was born in 1880. She died at a young age of 39 years old. They were born and raised in a house in the old part of Tórshavn, which is called Áarstova, down in the eastern harbour; only the brothers are often referred to as the Áarstovu Brothers (Áarstovubrøðurnir) and not their sister.

The brother's great grandfather was Jens Christian Djurhuus (1773–1853), who was the first to write poems in the Faroese language.

After finishing school Hans Andreas worked as a fisherman for a short period, then attended folkschool (Føroya Fólkaháskúli). He then studied at the Faroese Teachers School (Føroya Læraraskúli), graduating in 1905. He worked as a school teacher in Sandavágur, Klaksvík, Tvøroyri and Tórshavn. He also edited the newspaper Dúgvan from 1909 to 1910.

== Bibliography ==
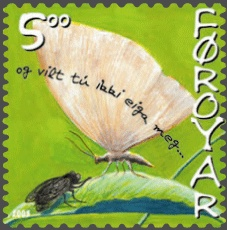
Ein firvaldur - A Butterfly. Faroese stamp from 2003 with motif from one of Djurhuus's poems.

- Ritsavn. ill. by William Heinesen. Tórshavn, 1952–1958, 7 vol. (collection of all of H.A. Djurhuus's works)

=== Poems ===
- 1905: Hin gamla søgan (The Old Story)
- 1915: Barnarímur (children's poems). New edition published in 2000, ill. by Elinborg Lützen. ISBN 99918-1-237-7
- 1916: Hildarljóð
- 1922: Søgumál. Tórshavn: Felagið Varðin – 126 pp.
- 1925: Sjómansrímur. (Seamen's poems). Notes published in 1993.
- 1932: Halgiljóð. Tórshavn: Varðin – 52 pp.
- 1934: Morgun- og kvøldsálmar (Morning- and evenings psalms)
- 1934: Undir víðum lofti. Tórshavn: Varðin – 415 pp. (utvalgte dikt). Nytt opplag 1970
- 1936: Yvir teigar og tún. Tórshavn: Varðin – 345 pp. (collected poems)
- 1936: Havet sang

=== Plays ===
- 1908: Marita
- 1917: Annika
- 1930: Álvaleikur
- 1930: Eitt ódnarkvøld (On a Stormy Night)
- 1933: Traðarbøndur
- 1935: Ólavsøkumynd
- 1936: Løgmansdótturin á Steig
- 1947: Leygarkvøld í Bringsnagøtu. Published as a book, Tórshavn, Varðin, 1947 – 61 pages

=== Other works ===
- 1922: Eitt ár til skips ("One year on board" – short-stories and fairytales)
- 1922: Barnabókin (The Children's Book)
  - 1927: Barnabókin, økt útgáva. New and changed edition 1970
- 1924: Føroya søga. Eitt stutt yvirlit. Tórshavn: Felagið Varðin – 59 S. (Faroese history)
  - 1952: Føroya søga, økt útgáva. New edition published in 1963
- 1927: Beinta (novel, based on the legend of Beinta Broberg; this was also the basis of Jørgen-Frantz Jacobsen's novel Barbara some years later)
- 1929: Ævintýr (Fairytale)
- 1950: Í mánalýsi
- 1975: Fyrisagnir til skúlabrúks. – Tórshavn: Føroya skúlabókagrunnur, 39 pp. (essays for teaching in the Faroese language for children)

=== Djurhuus in Norwegian translation ===
- 1936 Havet song. In Norwegian translation by Peter Molaug. Gyldendal forlag
