= Jørgen Iversen Dyppel =

Governor of the Danish West Indies (1638–1683)

1st Governor of The Danish West Indies
- In office May 26, 1672 – July 4, 1680
- Succeeded by: Nicolai Esmit

Personal details
- Born: February 25, 1638 Helsingør, Denmark
- Died: 1683 Atlantic ocean
- Spouse(s): 1st wife: Birgitte Pedersdatter; 2nd wife: Margrethe Christensdatter

Jørgen Iversen Dyppel (February 25, 1638 – 1683), also called George Iversen or Ifversen, or sometimes Doppel in Knox, was the first governor of the renewed establishment of St. Thomas in the Danish West Indies, from 1672 to 1680. His rule was marked by the work to construct a functioning colony and the difficulties of such a task.

== Biography ==
=== Early life ===
Dyppel was born in Helsingør, Denmark-Norway as the son of a baker from Holstein or Sønderjylland and Else Pedersdatter. The name Dyppel comes from Dybbøl in Southern Jutland.

After Dyppel's education, he went to the West Indies as an indentured servant. Krarup presumes he went with Carib. Partie's ship in 1654.

In the West Indies, Dyppel became a clerk with a British trader on Saint Christopher (Saint Kitts). In 1660, he and 3 Zeelandic merchants (most importantly Jan Basselaer) founded a trading company. During the next five years, Dyppel prospered and secured a small fortune. Upon a return trip to Europe in 1665, the British captured Dyppel's ship (according to Krarup, because he was unaware of the Anglo-Dutch War).

Dyppel went to Denmark, and had audiences with Frederick III of Denmark in the hopes of recovering the lost goods, which amounted to a value of 3000 rdl. He drafted a letter to Charles II of England, but never sent it due to the rising tension between Denmark and England. While in Denmark, Dyppel published the 1670 book Fire Sparetimers Fructer, a motivational treatise concerning piety and introspection. Krarup mentions that he cannot have been entirely destitute, as the publishing of such a book would likely be a substantial expense with little monetary reward. The same year, Dyppel married Birgitte Pedersdatter. The marriage took place in Dyppel's home, which at the time was only considered for the higher classes.

=== Governorship ===
Danish West India Company was organized in December 1670 and formally chartered on March 11, 1671. Dyppel bought a share for 1000 rdl. Due to his experiences in the West Indies, he was recommended to be the first governor by company director Peter Petersen Lerche, and took the position on April 29.

Den forgyldte Krone, under the Dutchman Arent Henriksen, was sent in advance to test the waters, but returned after waiting in vain for Dyppel. Dyppel's vessel Færøe had departed on October 20, 1671 and did not arrive until May 23 the following year. This delay was caused by a leak incurred in November 1671, and subsequent docking in Bergen for 3 months, during which time Dyppel had quite a task with controlling the crew which consisted partly of indentured servants and partly of convicted felons conscripted for duty.

Sources disagree on the exact date of his officially taking the gubernatorial position, as Bricka & Krarup has the date as May 26, 1672, where Westergaard has May 25 and Taylor has May 23.

At the time when Danish West India Company claimed St. Thomas, it had been abandoned by the previous English settlers, although some Dutch were there upon Dyppel's arrival. A British warship arrived shortly and made demands on behalf of the British crown, but they were rejected, and England rescinded its claim on September 23, 1672.

The estates of the present settlers were confirmed in deeds issued by Dyppel in 1678. Such estates were taxed for a capon or a turkey, which were used for a banquet each year. Future governors Nicolai and Adolph Esmit are named as land owners in the 1678 deeds.

I, Jørgen Iversen, His Majesty the King of Denmark and Norway, and the West India Company's Governor of the Island of St. Thomas, find it right and proper to proclaim this ordinance for the honor of God, and the good of the country.

— Jørgen Iversen Dyppel, Orders of August 8, 1672

His first orders included mandatory church attendance for all settlers (and piousness for white servants), the stocking of arms (swords and guns), and a curfew for black slaves. Additionally, a system of alarms were set up in the case of hostile ships. A settler who spotted a ship was to fire his gun and alert his neighbor, who would in turn alert the next. Any rule broken resulted in a fine of 10 to 1000 pounds of tobacco, depending on the offense. Taylor notes that none may leave the island without the governor's permission under penalty of 500 to 1000 pounds of tobacco, and that Dyppel was a strict disciplinarian in these matters.

The system of alarms was, according to Knox, instated due to the "Spaniards, at Porto Rico, still jealous of other nations possessing islands in their vicinity, [seeking] to annoy [St. Thomas] by every means in their power. They often descended by night upon the island, and stole negroes and cattle." Another concern was French and English buccaneers at Tortuga.

The fort on St. Thomas

Among Dyppel's initial tasks included organizing the clearing of forests, building roads and plantations. The building of a fort was underway, however with minor setbacks, as on January 6, 1674 Dyppel ordered that Carl Baggert move his house, as "it is not advantageous to the Fort, but at some time or other might be prejudicial that Baggert build his house so much higher than the Fort, insomuch that everyone who comes to him can completely overlook it." Baggert would later prove to be a factor in some of Dyppel's problems.

Due to the Danes not being used to the climate (Krarup mentions that the Danes had trouble with "the poisonous fumes" of the tropical forest, as well as the foreign food, whereas the Dutch were better acclimatized), as well as the Franco-Dutch and Anglo-Dutch wars, this proved a complex undertaking. Dyppel obtained some help from the British settlers of Tortola, mainly in the form of sugar cane captured from Tortola's former Dutch settlers.

At this time, the reputation of the Danish West India Company had reached a low among the Danish populace. The directors wrote that, "our company is among the common people of such ill repute, that they feel that serving in West India is a worse task than serving barbarians." Soon, Dyppel offered the company to add a year to his original 3-year contract, which was accepted with gratitude.

The high mortality rate and comfortless lives of hard work on the island soon made it nigh impossible to get volunteers for the colony, and the company started using convicted prisoners, lured with the promise of freedom, to a high degree. Dyppel proved a harsh governor for such elements, and physical punishment was common. Krarup has a dim view of the predominantly Dutch and convicted settlers, but skips over Dyppel's countrymen (Danes, Norwegians, and Holsteiners).

Slave trade was a significant part of the new colony's economy. Krarup relates the story of a Portuguese ship running aground in the vicinity, and how the slaves were salvaged. Due to their emaciated condition, they were given such names as "Benrad, Indtørret, Uden Bug, Sur Øje [etc]" ("Bones, Dried-up, No Gut, Sour Eye"). Likewise, Krarup mentions that Indian slaves were removed from the colony, as they were "worse escapees than the negros", to avoid inspiring the latter. One such Indian, Jan Indian, had his foot cut off to "curb his eagerness [for escape]".

On February 2, 1678, St. Thomas was attacked by the French, and albeit they were repelled, they abducted a number of slaves. Dyppel started improving the fortifications, a project which was finished on May 2, 1680. All hands on the island were involved in this, and during this time, they lodged in the fort. The task of defending St. Thomas proved taxing on Dyppel, and according to Krarup, Dyppel later said he sought refuge in "strong drinks". In 1679, Dyppel and a Pieter Jansen had a physical altercation outside the Reformed Church, and Dyppel put him in prison and kept him there without due process.

Dyppel's first wife died in 1679 and he became increasingly disillusioned, according to letters to the company, even counting the day he took up work with them as the worst day of his life. Dyppel called upon the company to find a replacement and they elected Nicolai Esmit as successor on September 6, 1679, and Dyppel officially resigned as governor on July 4, 1680. Esmit was welcomed with warmly.

=== Later life ===
About the transfer of the colony from Dyppel to Esmit, Krarup notes the accomplishments of Dyppel with great appreciation. Esmit even writes home to the company, speaking highly of the state of the island, expressing confusion at the displeasure with Dyppel on the part of plantationers such as the aforementioned Carl Baggert. Soon, however, Dyppel and Esmit clashed. Esmit had freed a settler Pieter Jansen who had been imprisoned under Dyppel. Dyppel called upon the new administration to review his term, for which he got a public declaration of appreciation. Rumors flourished that some signatures on the declaration had been forced, and Dyppel asked the settlers in front of Esmit if this was so, to which they all replied no.

Esmit, however, proclaimed himself the protector of Jansen, and warned Dyppel that he would not be allowed self-defence, even if Jansen physically attacked him. Likewise, they disagreed on the qualities of the fort built under Dyppel, as well as the interpretation of the bible. Dyppel left the island on September 20, 1680. One of the letters that travelled on the same ship was from Esmit to the company, charging Dyppel with falseness and self-enrichment, and that the colony had been misheld.

After returning to Denmark where he landed in Helsingør on February 24, 1681, Dyppel wrote a letter to the company saying that he would stay there a week to go to the altar at the church, not having done so in 9 years. He wrote that Esmit was not of "a good Danish mindset" and that he himself was "not affectionate of the German". He knows about the charges, but rebuts them firmly, which according to Krarup has a significant effect in their juxtaposition with the pious sinner that shines through the first part of the letter.

Dyppel arrived at the Danish West India Company on March 9. It soon became apparent that Esmit's appointment was a mistake. In 1682 it was decided that Dyppel would return to St. Thomas to reclaim the title as governor. He married the niece of Copenhagen mayor Bartholomæus Jensen, Margrethe Christensdatter. They met as Dyppel's son had found employ in Jensen's house.

It was proclaimed that the colony would give free passage to St. Thomas if prospective settlers would pay their own upkeep, and that any interested parties should announce themselves to Dyppel. However, none showed. Instead, all life-serving prisoners from the Holmen prison, as well as 20 women convicted of prostitution were selected.

=== Death ===
The royal ship Havmanden (The Merman or Neptunus) left Helsingør for St. Thomas on November 10. Dyppel writes home December 15, mentioning among other things that his wife has born a daughter on November 30, but nothing more is heard from the ship until it runs aground in Marstrand, Sweden.

In the subsequent investigation, it comes forth that the prisoners of the ship mutinied around New Year's Eve, 1683 somewhere in the Atlantic. They shot the captain and decapitated seven or eight crew members. The ship had come under the leadership of the prisoner Hans Borman, "an ungodly person", and Dyppel was thrown overboard with his newborn daughter and wife. His wife survived the ordeal and married a plantation owner on St. Thomas. Additionally, Krarup mentions that the widowed Margrethe Pedersdatter had been forced to "submit to the most degrading treatment of a virtuous woman".

After some time in Copenhagen, Dyppel's son, Iver Jørgensen Dyppel, settled on St. Thomas where he married Anna van Ockeren (daughter of Dutch plantation owner Simon van Ockeren), who upon becoming a widow married future Governor Claus Hansen. Iver and Anna had one daughter, Birgitte Iversdatter, who was sickly and had no children with her husband, surgeon Constantin Christian Cornetzsky. Thus ended Dyppel's bloodline.

Dyppel's legacy according to Biografisk Lexikon is that of an honest man and a hard worker.

Political offices
Preceded by none	Governor of the Danish West Indies; 1672–1680	Succeeded by Nicolai Esmit

== Bibliography ==
- Waldemar Westergaard, The Danish West Indies under Company Rule (1671 - 1754) (MacMillan, New York, 1917)
- C. F. Bricka (editor), Dansk biografisk Lexikon, first edition, 19 volumes, 1887–1905, Vol. VIII. Online edition available: https://runeberg.org/dbl/8/ (pages 332 & 333. Numbered as 334 & 335 in the online edition).
- Hugo Ryberg, Rigmor de Vicq, A list of the names of inhabitants - The Danish Westindian Islands (The Virgin Islands) from the sources in the Royal Danish State Archive (Copenhagen, 1945)
- John P. Knox, A Historical Account of St. Thomas (Charles Schribner, New York, 1852). Online edition available
- Holger Ehrencron-Müller, Forfatterlexikon omfattende Danmark, Norge og Island indtil 1814 (Aschehoug, Copenhagen, 1925–39)
- Frederik Krarup, Jørgen Iversen (Dyppel), Vestindisk Compagnies første Gouverneur paa St. Thomas in Personalhistorisk Tidsskrift, række 2, bind 6 (Otto B. Wroblewski, Hoffenbergske Etablissement, Copenhagen, 1891)
- Charles Edwin Taylor, Leaflets from the Danish West Indies (William Dawson & Sons, London, 1888)
- Krarup, Frederik: Jørgen Iversen (Dyppet), Vestindisk Gompagnies første Gouverneur paa St. Thoma
