= Kringvarp Føroya =

Public broadcaster in the Faroe Islands

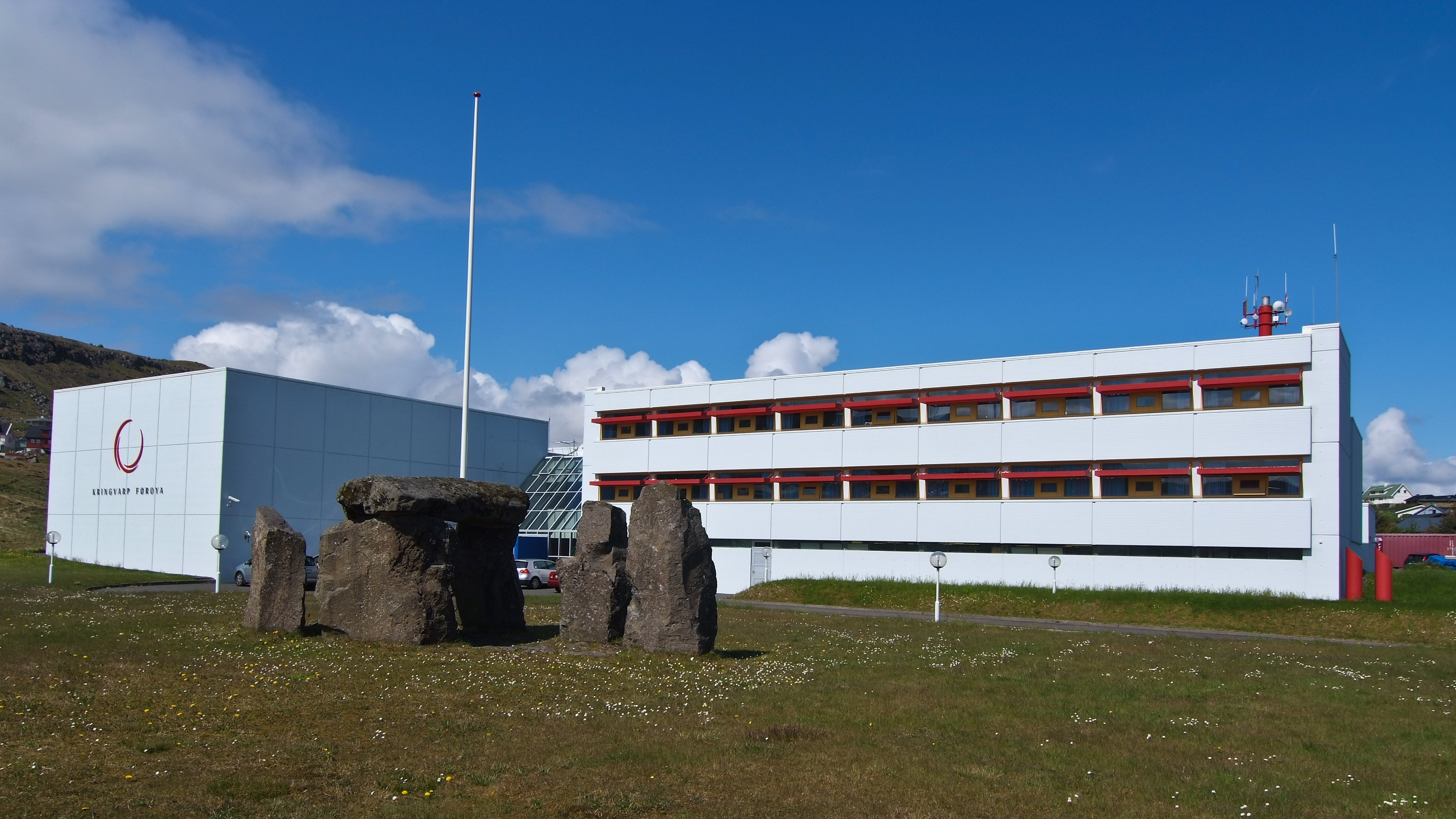
- KVF headquarters in 2008
- Type: Public broadcasting network (television, radio and online)
- Country: Faroe Islands
- Availability: Faroe Islands
- Founded: 1 January 2005; 21 years ago
- Headquarters: Norðari Ringvegur 20, Postsmoga 1299, FO-100; Tórshavn, Faroe Islands
- Broadcast area: Faroe Islands
- Owner: Government of the Faroe Islands
- Key people: Ivan Niclasen (CEO)
- Launch date: 1 January 2005
- Official website: kvf.fo
- Replaced: Sjónvarp Føroya (Television); Útvarp Føroya (Radio)

Kringvarp Føroya (English: Broadcasting Service of the Faroe Islands; KVF) is the national public broadcasting company of the Faroe Islands. It was founded on 1 January 2005 after a merger of the national radio and television networks Útvarp Føroya and Sjónvarp Føroya.

== History ==
=== Útvarp Føroya ===
Útvarp Føroya ("Radio of the Faroe Islands"; ÚF) was founded in 1957, under the station's first director Axel Tórgarð. Niels Juel Arge took over the position in 1960 and remained until 1990. Prior to the establishment of Útvarp Føroya, the Faroese people could only listen to foreign radio stations. These included NRK P1, the national Norwegian radio station often referred to as Norðmaðurin ("the Norwegian", "the man from Norway"), and the BBC World Service. These stations were mainly used for daily weather forecasts.

=== Sjónvarp Føroya ===
Sjónvarp Føroya ("Television of the Faroe Islands"; SvF) was founded in 1984. It was the only public TV station in the country, and broadcast some content in Faroese.

The history of SvF goes back to the 1960s. In 1969, the Faroese parliament decided to create an organisation for developing TV facilities on the islands under public law. A 1978 law set into motion the establishment of the network, which was founded as Sjónvarp Føroya in 1981. A furniture store in the capital Tórshavn was converted into a TV studio in 1983. On 1 April 1984 the first Faroese programme was launched; however, private local TV associations had been transmitting for six years. The regular operation of SVF started on 1 September of that same year.

In spring 1985, the former freelancers of Faroese TV were engaged as staff by the Faroese government. Since 1990, other nearby buildings have been bought in order to enhance the network's premises.

In December 2002, the Faroe Islands became the first country in the world to completely disconnect of its analogue television signals, which had used the PAL standard, in favour of the digital DVB-T standard.

By law, SvF had a goal of broadcasting one-third of its programmes in Faroese. Other programmes were mostly taken from Danmarks Radio (DR) and were subtitled, with Danish audio. In 2003, 27 percent of the SvF's programmes were in Faroese. Apart from children's programmes, SVF's own production consisted mainly of news and topical magazine items.

=== Kringvarp Føroya ===
In 2005, the SvF and ÚF were merged into the current company, which is funded by a combination of television licence fees, commercials, and a bingo (called Gekkurin, or "the Joker"). The television division of the Kringvarp Føroya has only one channel, with some programming coming from DR and TV 2 in Denmark. It also produces its own content, including Faroese news, which is called Dagur og Vika ("Day and Week"); children's TV; and some cultural and sports broadcasting.

Additional stations are available from Televarpið, the only local pay-TV provider, which is a digital terrestrial service. Satellite TV from foreign providers is also popular.

== See also ==
- Media of the Faroe Islands
