= Nema (company) =

- Industry: Telecommunications
- Predecessors: Faroedane; Com-Data; Reproz
- Founded: February 2007; 18 years ago
- Headquarters: Faroe Islands
- Products: Telecommunications; Stationery; Communication technologies
- Website: nema.fo

Nema is a Faroese telecommunications, stationery and communications technology company, founded in February 2007 after the merger of Faroedane, Com-Data and Reproz.

After the parliament (Løgting) made a new law in 1999 that allowed others to compete with Telefonverk Føroya Løgtings (TFL), which in the process changed its name to Føroya Tele, in 2001 Kall and Tele F became one company, Kall. Kall was renamed as Vodafone in 2008 and then to Hey in 2018.

In January 2019, Nema and Hey was mergered, creating a telecommunications, stationery and communications technology company, but the Hey telecommunications service brand was kept. In 2022, The telecommunications service abandoned the Hey trademark to start using the company's commercial name, offering all its products under the Nema brand.

== See also ==
- Føroya Tele
- List of mobile network operators in Europe
