= 1887 Faroese general election =

Danish territorial election

Partial general elections were held in the Faroe Islands in 1887 to elect nine of the eighteen elected members of the Løgting. The Danish administrator (Amtmaður) and the local dean (Próstur) were also members, with the administrator serving as the speaker.

== Electoral system ==
Members of the Løgting were elected by first-past-the-post voting, with voters having as many votes as there were seats available in their constituency. Nine of the 18 seats were elected every two years. Voting was restricted to men aged 25 or over who met certain tax-paying criteria.

== Results ==
Constituency	Elected members	Notes
Eysturoy	Johannes Petersen	Re-elected
Eysturoy	Jógvan Poulsen	Re-elected
Eysturoy	Samuel Jacob Rasmussen	Re-elected
Eysturoy	Christian Ludvig Weihe	
Norðurstreymoy	Ole Jacobsen	Re-elected
Norðurstreymoy	Olaus Johan Michal Johnsen	
Suðurstreymoy	Djóni í Geil	
Vágar	Mikkjal Danielsen	Re-elected
Vágar	Zacharias Nielsen	Re-elected
Source: Løgting

=== By constituency ===
Norðurstreymoy
Candidate	Votes	%
Ole Jacobsen	46	49.46
Olaus Johan Michal Johnsen	23	24.73
Joen Pauli Olsen	21	22.58
Thomas Debes	1	1.08
Jacob Jacobsen	1	1.08
Jens Henrik Lutherus Djurhuus	1	1.08
Total	93	100.00
Total votes	47	–
Registered voters/turnout	242	19.42
Source: Løgting
