= Rasmus Effersøe =

Faroese poet and politician (1857–1916)

Rasmus Christoffer Effersøe
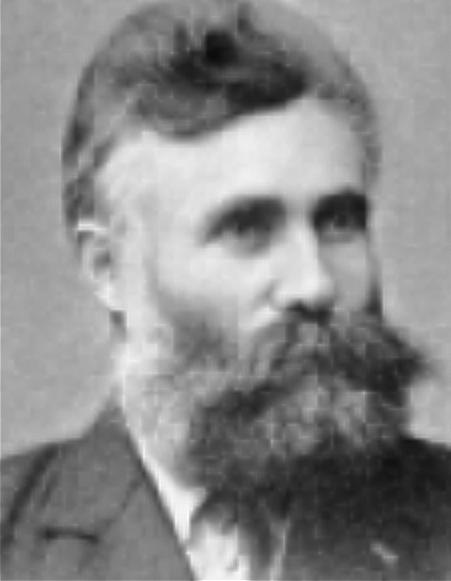
- Born: May 30, 1857; Trongisvágur
- Died: March 23, 1916 (aged 58); Tórshavn

Rasmus Christoffer Effersøe (May 30, 1857 – March 23, 1916) was a Faroese agronomist, poet, and politician.

Effersøe was born in Trongisvágur. His surname comes from the Icelandic island of Effersey (Old Norse Örfirisey 'island of the ebb tide'). He was the son of the local administrator (sysselmann) Gudmund Christie Laurentius Isholm Effersøe and the brother of the lawyer Poul Effersøe (1871–1926) and the politician Oliver Effersøe (1863–1933).

Effersøe was educated in Denmark and Sweden, and he worked as an agricultural supervisor. He was one of the nine men that convened the Christmas Meeting of 1888, which is considered the start of the Faroese independence movement; together with Jóannes Patursson, he is considered to have been a driving force in the movement. Effersøe and Patursson founded the Faroese Society (Faroese: Føringafelag), and Effersøe served as the editor of the society's newspaper, Føringatíðindi, which was the first newspaper written in Faroese. Effersøe also served as the editor of the newspapers Dúgvan and Dimmalætting, and he wrote for the theater, acted in the theater himself, and wrote poetry, including:

- "Førøya landið" (The Faroes, a patriotic poem)
- "Alfaðirs eygu jarðarríki skoða" (Allfather's Eye Guards the Earth)
- "Eitt heim, eitt varandi heim ei her" (One Home, One Lasting Home Not Here)
- "Eg minnist úr gomlum søgum" (I Remember from the Old Sagas)
- "Úr øllum ættum koma vindar" (The Wind Gathered from Every Direction)

Effersøe appears as "the old poet" (den gamle digter) on page 35 of William Heinesen's novel Glataðu spælimenninir (The Lost Musicians). A bust of Effersøe, created by Anne Marie Carl-Nielsen, was unveiled in 1933 in front of the parliament building in Tórshavn.

Rasmus Effersøe died in Tórshavn.
