= 1899 Faroese general election =

Danish territorial election

Partial general elections were held in the Faroe Islands in 1899 to elect nine of the eighteen elected members of the Løgting. The Danish administrator (Amtmaður) and the local dean (Próstur) were also members, with the administrator serving as the speaker.

== Electoral system ==
Members of the Løgting were elected by first-past-the-post voting, with voters having as many votes as there were seats available in their constituency. Nine of the 18 seats were elected every two years. Voting was restricted to men aged 25 or over who met certain tax-paying criteria.

== Results ==
Constituency	Elected members	Notes
Eysturoy	Ole Olsen	
Eysturoy	Jógvan Poulsen	Re-elected
Eysturoy	Magnus Poulsen	Re-elected
Eysturoy	Hans Peter Weihe	
Norðurstreymoy	Ole Jacobsen	Re-elected
Norðurstreymoy	Søren Emil Müller	Re-elected
Suðurstreymoy	Júst Jacobsen	
Vágar	Mikkjal Danielsen	Re-elected
Vágar	Daniel Niclasen	Re-elected
Source: Løgting

=== By constituency ===
Norðurstreymoy
Candidate	Votes	%
Søren Emil Müller	100	45.87
Ole Jacobsen	78	35.78
Ole Johannes Olsen	30	13.76
Niels Winther	5	2.29
Jens S. Jensen	2	0.92
A.S. Reinert	1	0.46
Jens Hendrik Lutherus Djurhuus	1	0.46
Jacob Petersen	1	0.46
Total	218	100.00
Total votes	109	–
Registered voters/turnout	264	41.29
Source: Løgting

== Aftermath ==
Daniel Niclasen died in 1900 and was replaced by Dánjal Pauli Michelsen. Magnus Poulsen was replaced by Ole Hansen Dahl in 1902.
