= Tom Mikkelsen =

Canadian neuro-oncologist (born 1959)

Tommy Mikkelsen (born 3 January 1959) is a Canadian neuro-oncologist who is president and scientific director of the Ontario Brain Institute and co-director of the Hermelin Brain Center at Henry Ford Hospital, Detroit.

He completed his MD at the University of Calgary in 1983.
