= Faroese Society =

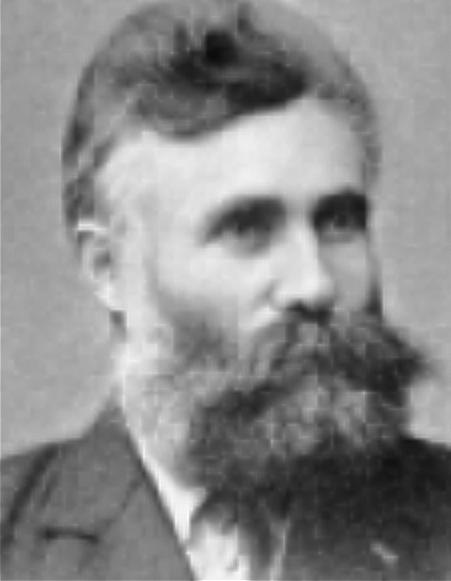
Rasmus Christoffer Effersøe (1857-1916)

The Faroese Society (Faroese: Føringafelag) was a Faroese association.

The society was established on January 6, 1889 with a twofold objective: 1) For the Faroese language to regain its honor and dignity, and 2) For the Faroese to stick together and develop in all areas so that they can fend for themselves.

Poor weather had prevented many people from the most remote villages from attending the Christmas Meeting of 1888 on the second day of Christmas in Tórshavn. A second meeting was therefore convened on January 6, 1889. As at the Christmas Meeting, Rasmus Effersøe and Jóannes Patursson attended and were the leading forces there.

In 1890 the society established its own newspaper, Føringatíðindi (The Faroes Journal).

The society disbanded in 1901.
