= Føringatíðindi =

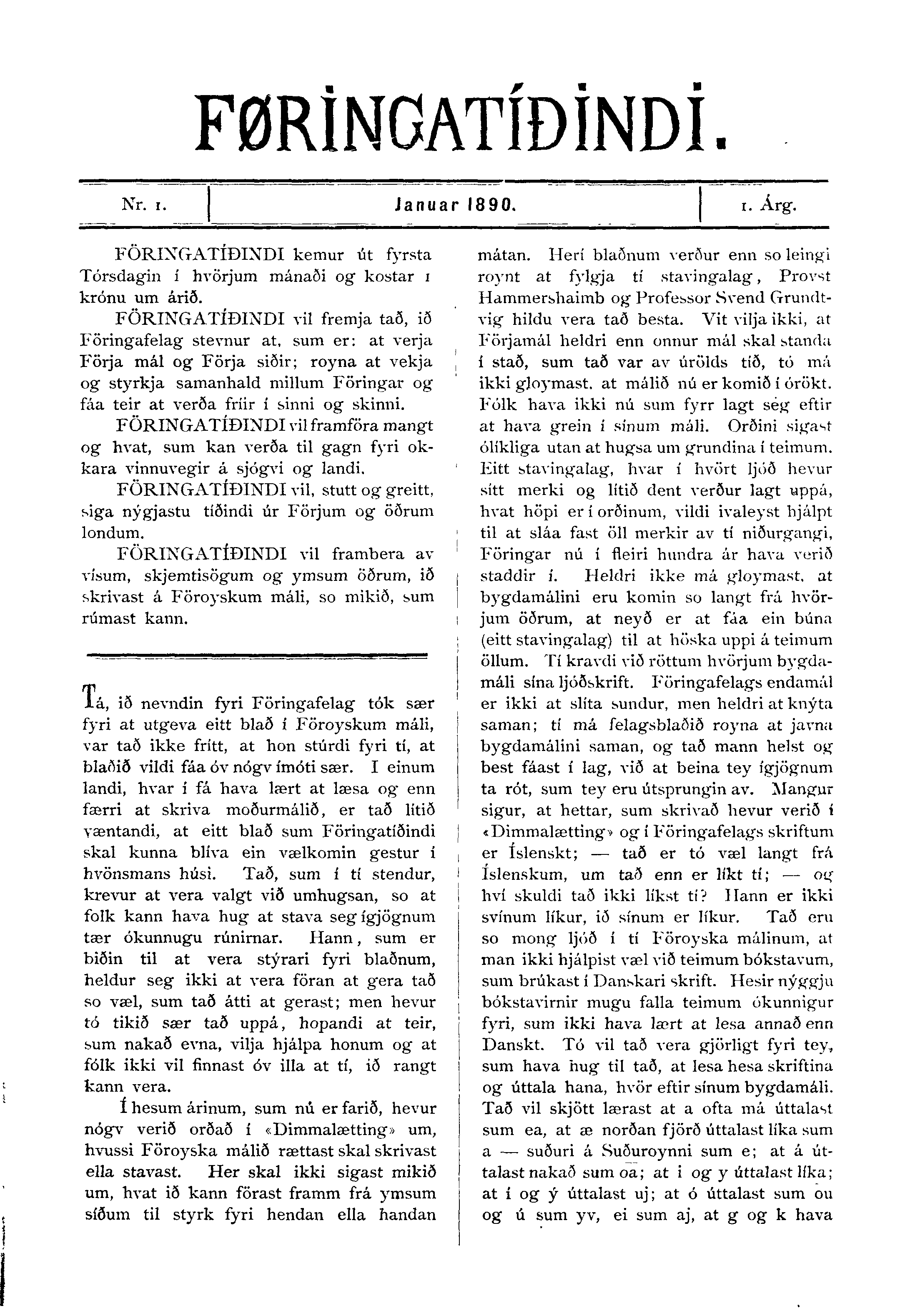
Føringatíðindi no. 1, from 1890

Føringatíðindi (The Faroes Journal) was a Faroese newspaper. It was published from January 1890 to December 1901, and then again from January to December 1906. The newspaper was the organ of the Faroese Society (Faroese: Føringafelag) and it was the first newspaper written in Faroese. It was characterized by lexical purism.

The paper's long-serving editor, Rasmus Effersøe, was one of the leading men of his generation in the Faroese independence movement, and he was one of the nine men that convened the Christmas Meeting of 1888. Andrias Christian Evensen, who also served as editor during the short publication span in 1906, was one of the first to propagate the use of Faroese in education and church.

== Editors ==
- Rasmus Effersøe, 1890–1901
- Andrias Christian Evensen, 1906

== See also ==
- Símun Mikkjal Zachariasen
