= Dúgvan =

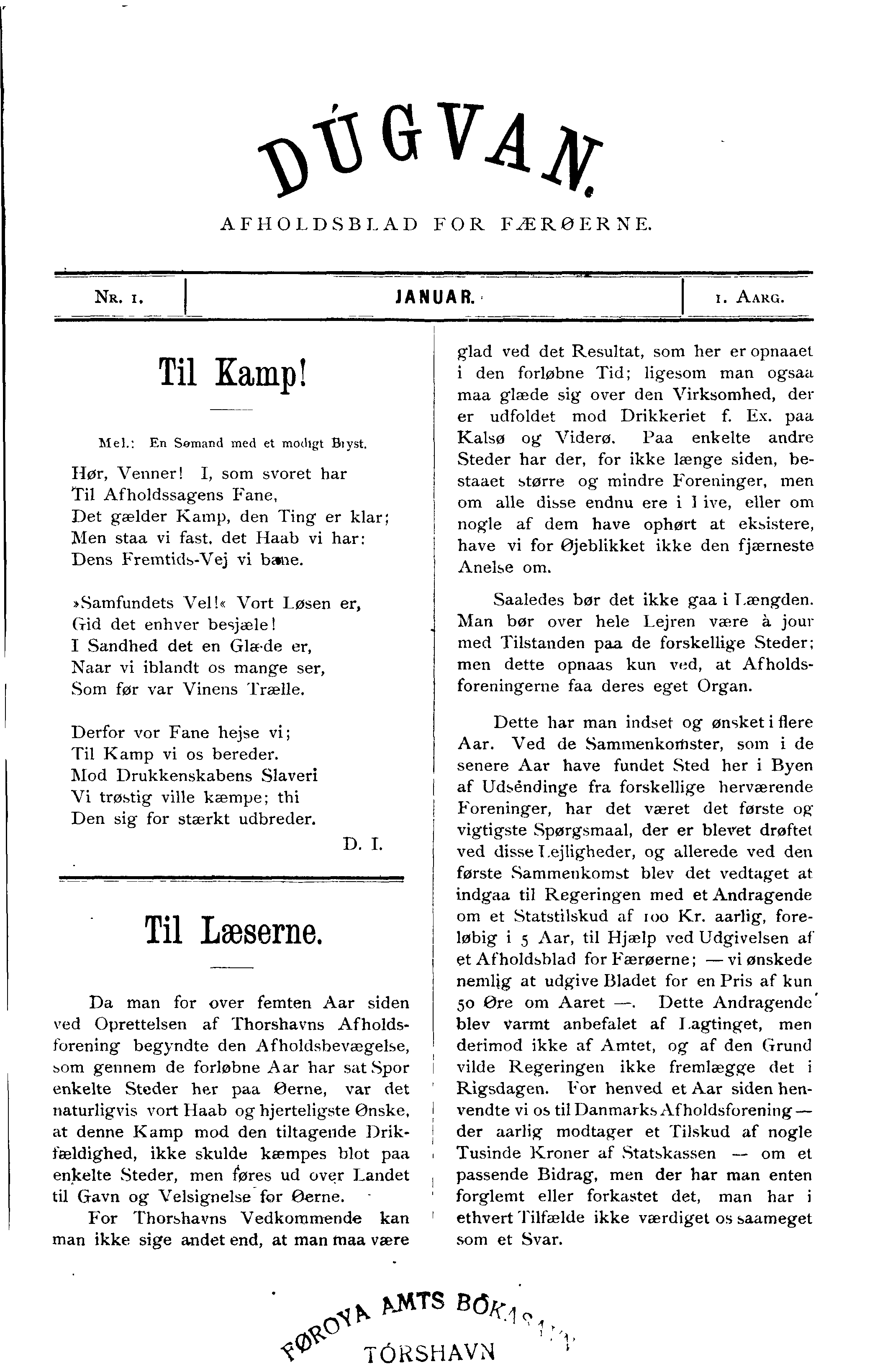
Dúgvan no. 1, from 1894

Dúgvan (Faroese pronunciation: [ˈdɪgvan], 'The Dove') was a Faroese monthly newspaper. It was published from January 1894 to 1928 primarily in Danish (with some Faroese), with the subtitle afholdsblad for Færøerne 'temperance newsletter for the Faroe Islanders'. A new newspaper with the same name and purpose was also published from 1941 to 1942 in Faroese.

== Editors ==
- P. Jensen, 1894–1899
- Rasmus Effersøe, 1899–1900
- Djóni í Geil, 1899–1907
- Hans Andrias Djurhuus, 1908–1910
- Rasmus Effersøe, 1910–1915
- Poul Niclasen, 1916–1925
- Símun av Skarði, 1927–1928
