= Kvinna =

Faroese magazine

Kvinna (Women in Faroese) is a Faroese magazine for women, which was established on 11 November 2004. It is the only Faroese magazine for women. Kvinna publishes 8 magazines yearly and is distributed by the company Sansir.

== Music releases ==
Kvinna has released several CDs with Faroese female artists. In 2010 they released a Christmas CD along with the Christmas edition of Kvinna in November.

== Kvinna.fo ==
The magazine's website, Kvinna.fo, hosts a chat forum mainly for women and blogs written by Faroese women.

== Events ==
Kvinna arranges events throughout the year, i.e. a running event for women, concerts with Faroese female singers etc.

== Kvinnurenningin running event ==
Once a year they arrange a run only for women. The women can run or walk 4.8 km. This event is not a competition, there are no medals or trophies for the winner. It is mainly an event just for having fun and because running is healthy. The event is quite popular, one of the biggest running events in the Faroe Islands. The run is called Kvinnurenningin, it was held for the first time in 2005 on 20 August. The Women's Run was held again in 2006 and 2007, but in 2008 there was no such event. In 2009 the event was arranged again, and this time 1070 women participated, which was a success for a small nation with only 48,000 inhabitants. As of 2024 the event was still being held.
