= Birna Tummasardóttir Mikkelsen =

Faroese footballer (born 1994)

Birna Mikkelsen
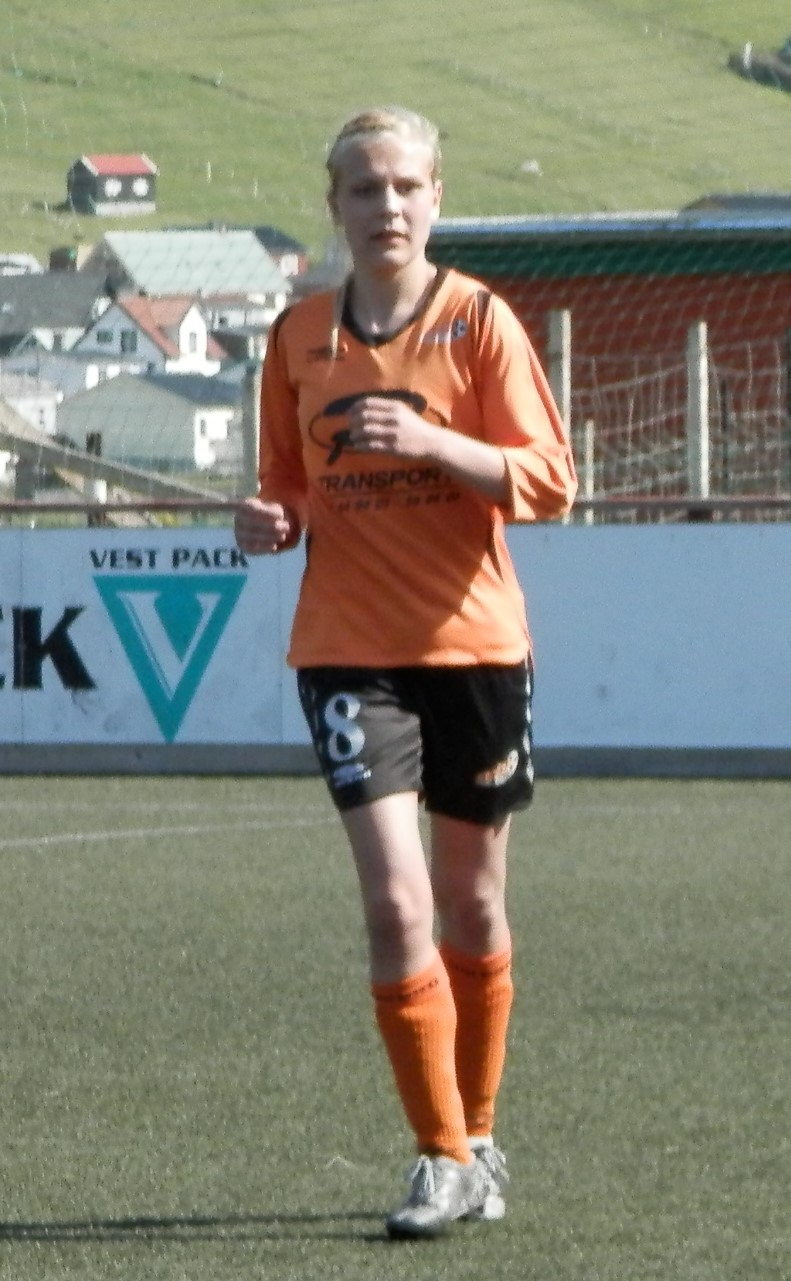
- Birna Johannesen is a Faroese football player. Here she is playing for Skála ÍF against FC Suðuroy in 2012.

Personal information
- Full name: Birna Tummasardóttir Mikkelsen
- Date of birth: 1 April 1994 (age 32)
- Position: Midfielder

Senior career*
Years	Team	Apps	(Gls)
2009–2012	Skála ÍF	52	(10)
2013-2020	EB/Streymur/Skála	123	(64)

International career^{‡}
2010	Faroe Islands U17	3	(1)
2010–2012	Faroe Islands U19	8	(0)
2017–	Faroe Islands	11	(0)
- * Club domestic league appearances and goals as of 21 September 2023 ‡ National team caps and goals as of 9 July 2019

Birna Tummasardóttir Mikkelsen (born 4 January 1994) is a Faroese football midfielder who currently plays for EB/Streymur/Skála and the Faroe Islands women's national football team.

== Honours ==
EB/Streymur/Skála

- 1. deild kvinnur: 2017, 2018
- Steypakappingin kvinnur: 2017, 2018
