= 1901 Faroese general election =

Danish territorial election

Partial general elections were held in the Faroe Islands in 1901 to elect nine of the eighteen elected members of the Løgting. The Danish administrator (Amtmaður) and the local dean (Próstur) were also members, with the administrator serving as the speaker.

== Electoral system ==
Members of the Løgting were elected by first-past-the-post voting, with voters having as many votes as there were seats available in their constituency. Nine of the 18 seats were elected every two years. Voting was restricted to men aged 25 or over who met certain tax-paying criteria.

== Results ==
Constituency	Elected members	Notes
Norðoyggjar	Jógvan Michael Matras	
Norðoyggjar	Klæmint Olsen	Re-elected
Sandoy	Johan Hendrik Schrøter	Previously elected in Suðuroy
Sandoy	Jóhan Hendrik Poulsen	Re-elected
Suðuroy	Niels Juel Mortensen	
Suðuroy	Jóannes Patursson	
Suðurstreymoy	Jens Andreasen	
Suðurstreymoy	Djóni í Geil	
Suðurstreymoy	Poul Niclasen	
Source: Løgting
