= 1885 Faroese general election =

Danish territorial election

Partial general elections were held in the Faroe Islands in 1885 to elect nine of the eighteen elected members of the Løgting. The Danish administrator (Amtmaður) and the local dean (Próstur) were also members, with the administrator serving as the speaker of the Løgting.

== Electoral system ==
Members of the Løgting were elected by first-past-the-post voting, with voters having as many votes as there were seats available in their constituency. Nine of the 18 seats were up for election every two years. Voting was restricted to men aged 25 or over who met certain tax-paying criteria.

== Results ==
Constituency	Elected members	Notes
Norðoyggjar	Jens Christian Djurhuus	
Norðoyggjar	Klæmint Olsen	Re-elected
Sandoy	Jóannes Dalsgaard	Re-elected
Sandoy	Jóan Petur Hentze	Re-elected
Suðuroy	Ole Michael Nielsen	Re-elected
Suðuroy	Johan Hendrik Schrøter	
Suðurstreymoy	Johannes Danielsen	
Suðurstreymoy	Oliver Petræus Effersøe	Re-elected
Suðurstreymoy	Hans Christopher Müller	
Source: Løgting

== Aftermath ==
Jóannes Dalsgaard died in 1887 and was replaced by Poul Poulsen.
