= Sosialurin =

Faroese newspaper

- Type: Daily newspaper
- Editor: Eirikur Lindenskov
- Founded: 1927
- Political alignment: Centre-left
- Language: Faroese
- Headquarters: Tórsgøta 1, 110, Tórshavn
- Circulation: 7,500 (as of 2022)
- Website: www.sosialurin.fo

Sosialurin is a Faroese newspaper located in Tórshavn. It is written in the Faroese language. The newspaper, in partnership with Føroya Tele, the Faroese public telecommunications company, operates the website in.fo

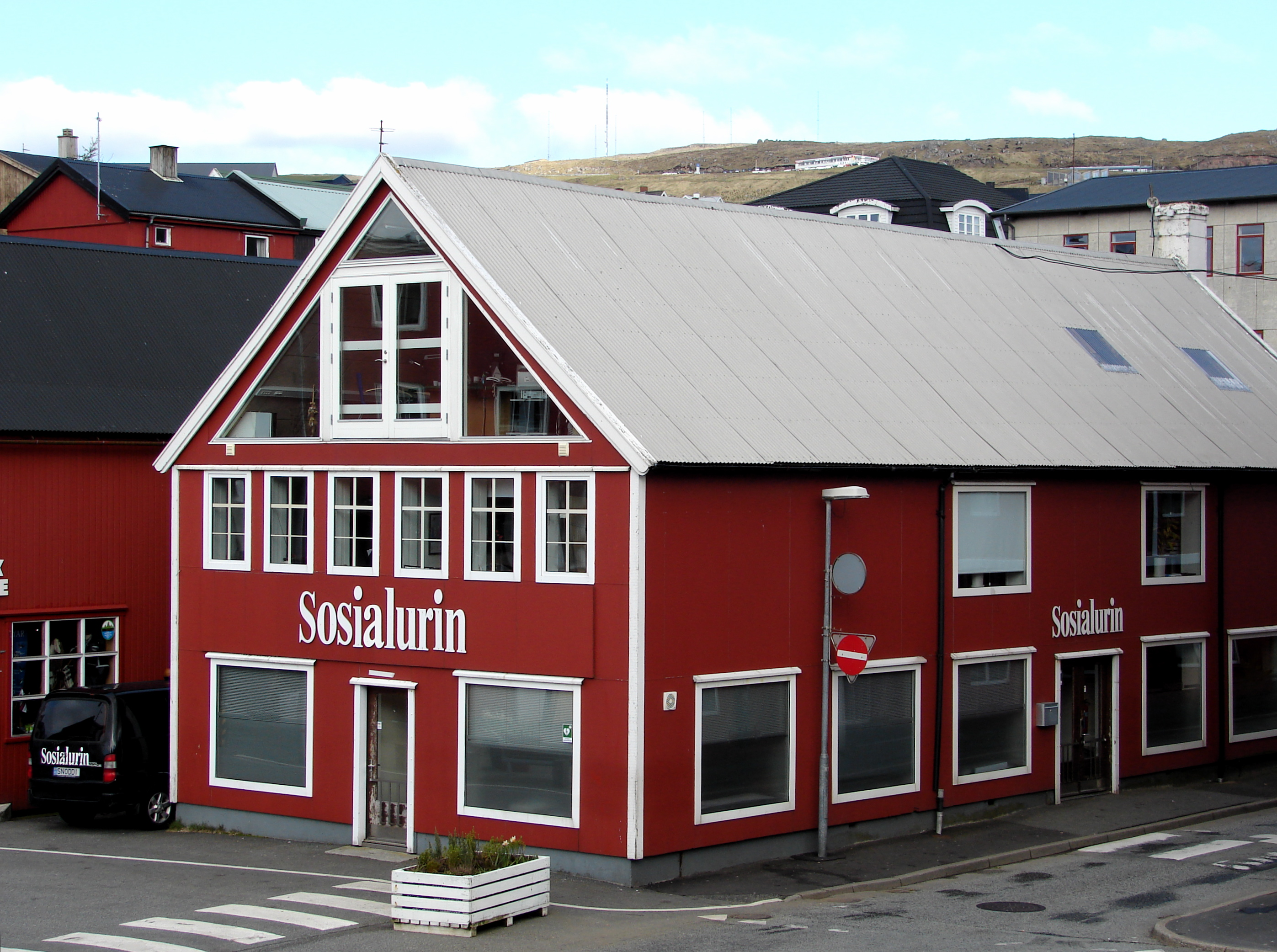
Sosialurin offices in Tórshavn

== History ==
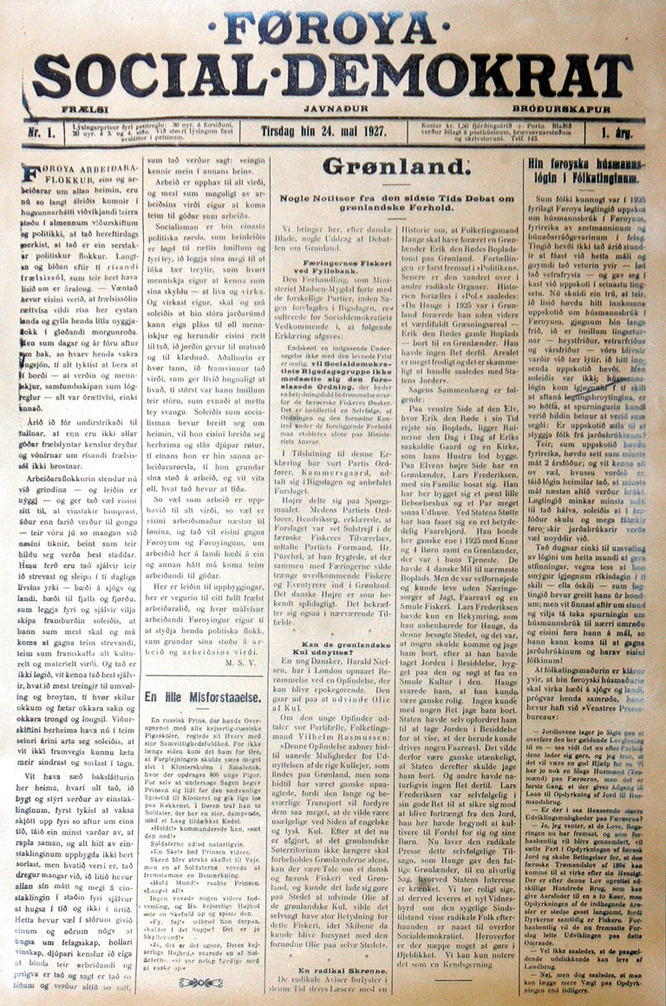
The newspaper was first published in 1927 as the Føroya Social Demokrat.

The newspaper published its first copy on 27 May 1927, as the Føroya Social Demokrat, and originally it was associated with the Social Democratic Party. From 1945 to 1955 the newspaper circulated under the name Føroya Sosial-Demokratur. In 2006 the Social Democratic Party sold their part of the shares to a new company, Miðlahúsið, that was owned by the newspaper's management, employees and Føroya Tele.

== Circulation ==
Sosialurin is the largest newspaper in Faroe Islands. Since March 2020 it is published once a week reaching the circulation of 7,500 copies

== See also ==
- Media of the Faroe Islands
