= Andrias Christian Evensen =

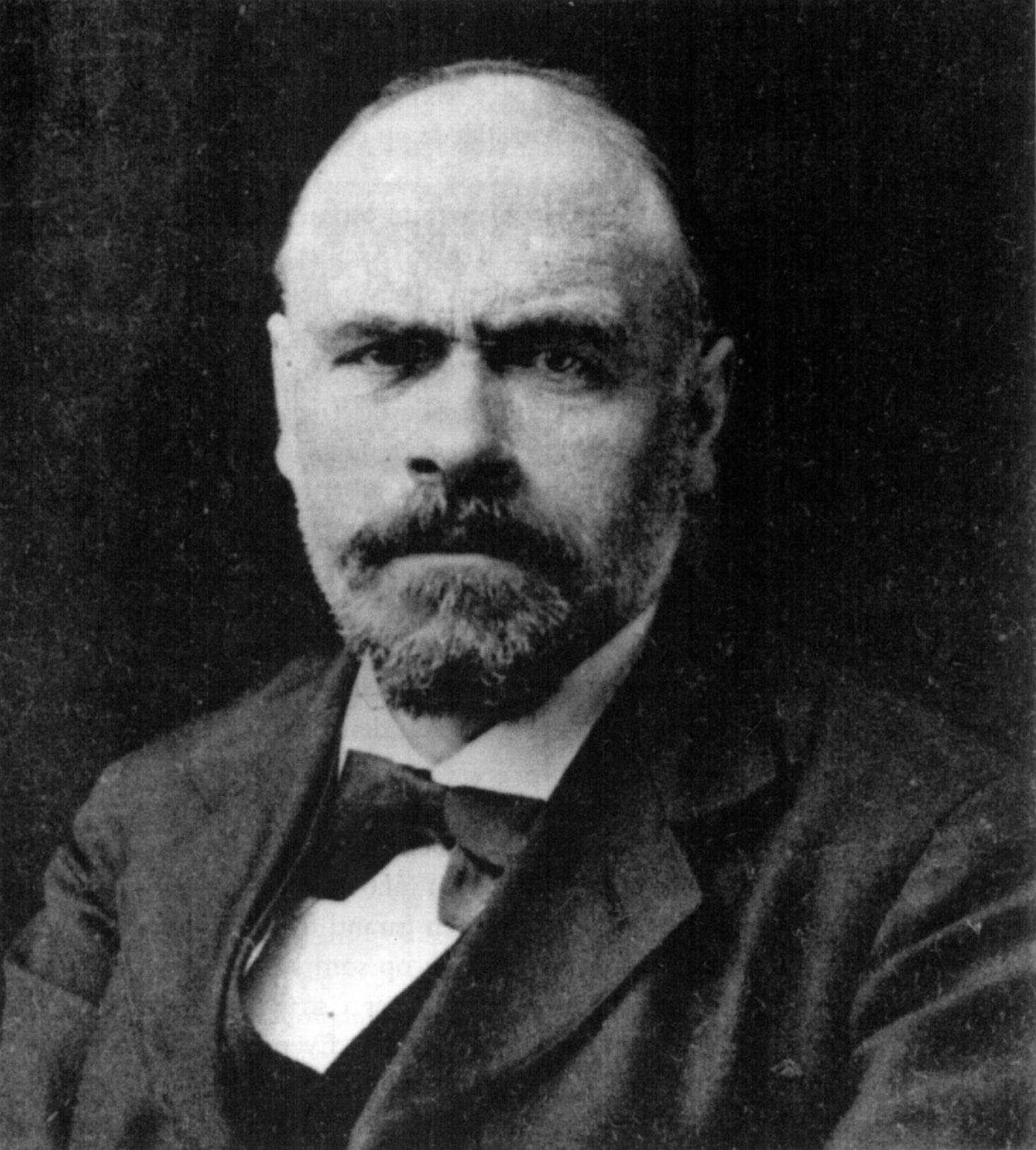
- Born: December 6, 1874; Viðareiði
- Died: October 21, 1917 (aged 42); Copenhagen

Andrias Christian Evensen (December 6, 1874 – October 21, 1917) was a Faroese priest, editor, writer, and politician for the Home Rule Party (Faroese: Sjálvstýrisflokkurin). Together with Jákup Dahl, he was one of the first to propagate the use of Faroese, including as a church language in preference to Danish.

Evensen was born in Viðareiði. He received his examen artium certification in 1894 and the degree of cand.theol. in 1901. Evensen became the parish priest in Sandur in 1902, and then served as the dean for the Faroe Islands from April 1917 until his death in October that year. He became the editor of the newspaper Føringatíðindi in 1906. Evensen was active in the Løgting as a parliamentary representative from Sandoy from 1908 to 1917. He eventually broke away from the Home Rule Party (Faroese: Sjálvstýrisflokkurin) and was an independent representative during his last year in the Løgting.

Together with the writer Rasmus Rasmussen and the archivist and politician Anton Degn, he established the publisher Hitt føroyska Bókamentafelagið (The Faroese Book Cultivation Association) in 1907. Evensen died in Copenhagen.

== Bibliography ==
- 1899: Smásangir og sálmar (Short Songs and Psalms; editor)
- 1900: Skálkaleikur. Mortansmessuteiti (Roguish Games. Saint Martin's Evening Cabaret)
- 1902: Búreisingur (The Settler; journal, only six issues)
- 1906: Føroysk orðabók, 1.–10.hft. (Faroese Dictionary, vols. 1–10; 1905–1906)
- 1906: Føroysk lesibók fyri eldri børn (Faroese Reader for Older Children)
- 1907: Stavingarbók (Spelling Book)
- 1907: Stavingarbók og lesibók fyri yngri børn (Spelling Book and Reader for Younger Children)
- 1908: Lesibók fyri yngri børn (Reader for Younger Children)
- 1910: Kvæðabók I (Folk Ballads Volume I)
- 1911: Lesibók (Reader)
- 1912: Lesibók til læraraskúlan (Reader for Teacher Training School)
- 1914: Savn til Føroya søgu í 16. øld (Anthology of Sixteenth-Century Faroese Sagas; 1908–1914)
- 1963: Harubókin (a reader for younger children)
