= Claus Hansen =

Governor of the Danish West Indies

Claus Hansen (died 8 February 1706) was Governor of the Danish West Indies from 19 February 1702 until his death.

Hansen started his career in the West Indies as one of the soldiers brought by Jørgen Thormøhlen on the latter's lesseeship in 1690. He was promoted to ensign in 1692 by Governor Frans de la Vigne.

In 1699 Hansen married Anna van Ockeren, the widow of Iver Jørgensen Dyppel, son of deceased Governor Jørgen Iversen Dyppel. She died the same year, leaving him the Dyppel fortune.

Upon John Lorentz' death on 19 February 1702, the planters named Hansen as governor, whereas the colony officials decided upon Joachim von Holten. However, the Danish West India Company sided with Hansen, and he was installed in office. He died only four years later, on 8 February 1706.

His legacy according to Dansk Biografisk Lexikon is the institution of the island councils.

== Bibliography ==
- C. F. Bricka (editor), Dansk biografisk Lexikon, first edition, 19 volumes, 1887–1905, Vol. VI. Online edition available: https://runeberg.org/dbl/6/ (page 608. Numbered as 610 in the online edition).

Political offices
Preceded by John Lorentz	Governor of the Danish West Indies; 1702–1706	Succeeded by Joachim Melchior von Holten
