= Føroya Tele =

Public telecommunications company in the Faroe Islands

- Company type: Partafelag
- Industry: Telecommunications
- Founded: 1906; 119 years ago
- Headquarters: Tórshavn Municipality, Faroe Islands
- Area served: Faroe Islands
- Owner: Government of the Faroe Islands
- Number of employees: (230)
- Website: www.ft.fo

Føroya Tele P/f (FT) is the public telecommunications company in the Faroe Islands. It is one of the largest companies in the country with 230 employees and an annual turnover of around €40 million. The head office is in Tórshavn Municipality.

In 2005 the company had exactly 19,286 fixed network and 32,763 mobile phone customers (with a population of around 48,000).

== History ==
The first telephone line was set up in the Faroe Islands in 1905. Ólavi á Heygum from Vestmanna established the connection between his place and the capital Tórshavn. The following year, Løgting took over this management. The state telephone company was given the Danish name Færøernes Amtskommunes Telefonvæsen (Telephone system of the Faroe Municipality) and later Telefonverk Føroya Løgtings (Telephone company of the Faroese Lögtings).

In 1930 all places in the Faroe Islands were connected to the telephone network. According to Suðuroy there was initially only a radio connection with the rest of the country. In 1953 Tórshavn was given automatic dialling, which was introduced nationwide until 1978. From 1954 there was a radio link with Denmark, but only on one channel. In 1961 the situation improved with the SCOT-ICE submarine cable between Scotland, the Faroe Islands and Iceland (decommissioned in 1988).

In 1971 the SHEFA submarine cable to the Shetland Islands followed as a joint project between the Danish Post og Telegrafvæsenet and the British Post Office. This enabled 480 calls to be made simultaneously for the first time abroad.

In 1987 the satellite reception system in Tórshavn was put into operation. The satellite radio was intended as protection against malfunctions in the cable network. Usually, however, most of the conversations were conducted over the cables.

In 1993/94 the transatlantic optical fiber cable CANTAT-3 was laid from Canada to Europe (Great Britain, Germany and Denmark). Attention was paid to branches to Iceland and the Faroe Islands. The cable comes ashore in Tjørnuvík in the north of Streymoy Island. From there, a 53 km long fiber optic cable was laid to Tórshavn. In November 1994 the CANTAT-3 station in the Faroe Islands went into operation. This was the first time that the islands were directly connected to the North American continent.

The telephone network has been completely digitized since 1998 and there is a comprehensive GSM network for mobile telephony.

ADSL has also become widely available on the smaller islands after the FARICE-1 cable between the Faroe Islands and Iceland went into service in 2004, which extends to Scotland. Since then, the CANTAT-3 cable has only been used as a "backup", since it no longer meets today's requirements for data volumes.

In the summer of 2007, another undersea cable, SHEFA-2, was laid from the Faroe Islands via the Shetland Islands and Orkney to Scotland. Føroya Tele played a leading role in getting the Shetland Islands and Orkney the first broadband access to the Internet - long before the British BT Group was able to do this. Together with the FARICE cable, these two cables ensure the reliable connection of the islands to the outside world.

== Group ==
In 1998, the state-owned Telefonverk Føroya Løgtings was transferred to a publicly owned limited company. The Faroe Islands' national government owned 100% of the shares. In 1997, a new telecommunications law was passed that opened for private ownership.

June 30, 2005 Føroya Tele was divided into several subsidiaries. These include FT Net (internet), FT Samskifti (telecommunications, customer service), Televarpið (DVB-T, IPTV) and Faroese Telecom International, which takes care of the international market.

Together with the newspaper Sosialurin, Føroya Tele runs the internet portal portal.fo, which is the most visited Faroese website. In 2018, FT Net changed its name to NET.

== See also ==
- Nema
- List of mobile network operators in Europe
