= Oyggjatíðindi =

Faroese newspaper

Oyggjatíðindi is a Faroese weekly online newspaper and website. It was also available in print until September 2011, when it switched to an online-only format.

It was published for the first time on 25 November 1977 by initiator Lasse Klein and others while the newspapers first editor was Arni Joensen. Lasse Klein was editor from December 1978 to 1982. Oyggjatíðindi first started as a part of Norðlýsið - the local newspaper from Norðoyggjar (the Northern Islands) with base in Klaksvík which later developed and became the local newspaper for the island Eysturoy in collaboration with Norðlýsið. After some time Oyggjatíðindi was sold throughout all the islands.

Dan Klein took over as editor in 1982, and has continued to serve in this position to this day. In addition, most of the content is written by him personally as well.

== Editors ==
- 1977 - 1978: Arni S. F. Joensen
- May - December 1978: Sigmund Poulsen
- 1978 - 1982: Lasse Klein
- 1982 - present: Dan Klein
