= Nicolai Esmit =

2nd Governor of The Danish West Indies
- In office 4 July 1680 – November 1682
- Preceded by: Jørgen Iversen Dyppel
- Succeeded by: Adolph Esmit

Personal details
- Born: unknown Holstein
- Died: unknown Denmark

Nicolai Esmit (also called Nicolay or Nicholas and Schmidt) was governor of St. Thomas in the Danish West Indies from 4 July 1680 - November 1682. He was born in Holstein. His younger brother Adolph Esmit succeeded him as governor of St. Thomas.

== Biography ==
According to Dansk Biografisk Lexikon, Esmit served under England on Jamaica after finishing school. In 1678, he and his brother were issued deeds for land they owned in St. Thomas. Esmit was the only applicant to the position of governor after Jørgen Iversen Dyppel's wish for retirement on 9 September 1679 and was instated on the latter's official retirement on 4 July 1680.

The island was characterized by a lack of manpower at the time, and Christian V bought slaves from the African king of the Akan people for the colony.

However, Esmit appeared to Danish West India Company to be subverting the work of Dyppel, and in 1682 they were sending Dyppel back. However, Dyppel died en route due to a mutiny, and before a new governor could be named to succeed Esmit, his brother Adolph led a revolution that overthrew his authority in 1682.

After managing to escape to Copenhagen, Esmit was put on trial, but was declared insane. The court awarded him damages of 20000 rigsdaler from his brother, but he refused to comply.

Admiralitetsraad Jens Lassen saw to it that Esmit was paid a small pension until his death.

Preceded by Jørgen Iversen Dyppel	Governor of the Danish West Indies; 1680–1682	Succeeded by Adolph Esmit

== Bibliography ==
- Waldemar Westergaard, The Danish West Indies under Company Rule (1671 - 1754) (MacMillan, New York, 1917)
- C. F. Bricka (editor), Dansk biografisk Lexikon, first edition, 19 volumes, 1887–1905, Vol. IV. Online edition available: https://runeberg.org/dbl/4/ (pages 599 and 600. Numbered as 601 and 602 in the online edition).
- John P. Knox, A Historical Account of St. Thomas (Charles Schribner, New York, 1852). Online edition available
