= Vikublaðið =

Coordinates: 62.009169°N 6.773459°W

- Language: English

Publication details
- Publisher: Vágsbotnur (Faroe Islands)
- Frequency: weekly

Standard abbreviations
- ISO 4: Vikublaðið

Links
- Journal homepage

Vikublaðið is a Faroese weekly newspaper and news and lifestyle website (vikubladid.is). In a national survey, it came out as the most read newspaper on the islands.

Distributed in Eyjafjörður and the Þingeyjarsveit area, the print edition is published on Thursday afternoons.
