= Vinnuvitan =

Vinnuvitan.biz is an industry database in the Faroe Islands. In 2010, its parent company P/F Dimmalætting was acquired by Faroese investment company Løkir.

Vinnuvitan was first published in December 2004. It was originally published every other week, but since then the newspaper has grown in size and popularity and is now published every Thursday. In addition to the newspaper, Vinnuvitan is also a publishing house, releasing a minor number of books each year including Skipalistan and Okkara Sangbók.

Vinnuvitan is also the founder and organizer of the Faroese Advertising Awards (Kolan) that are held annually. Vinnuvitan was chosen Best Achievement of 2006 (Ársins Átak) by the Faroese House of Industry.
