= Norðlýsið =

Faroese newspaper

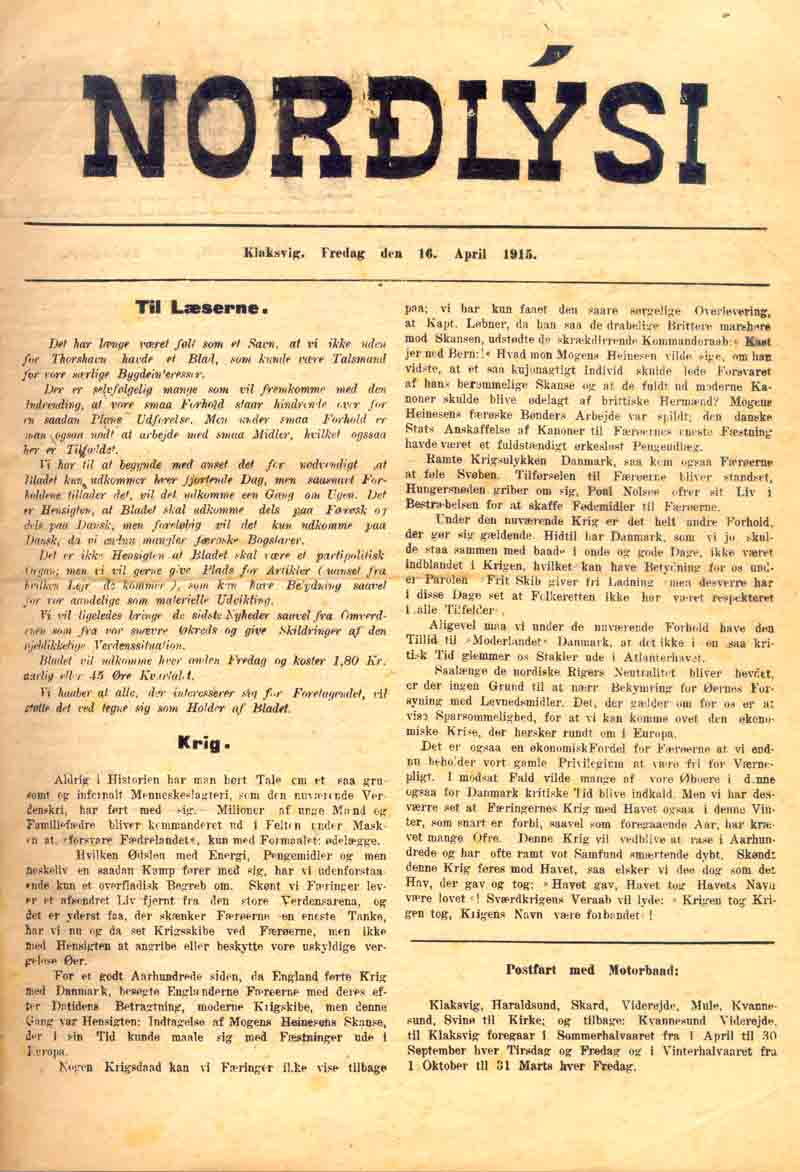
Norðlýsið no. 1, April 16, 1915

Norðlýsið is a Faroese newspaper, which has a mainly local northern focus on its news. It was founded in 1915, becoming the first local newspaper.
