= Adolph Esmit =

Danish colonial administrator and slave trader

Governor of The Danish West Indies
- In office 1683–1684
- Preceded by: Nicolai Esmit
- Succeeded by: Gabriel Milan

Governor of The Danish West Indies
- In office 1687–1688
- Preceded by: Christopher Heins
- Succeeded by: Christopher Heins

Personal details
- Born: unknown Probably Holstein
- Died: unknown Courland

Adolph Esmit was a Danish colonial administrator and slave trader who served as governor of St. Thomas in the Danish West Indies from 1683 to 1684, and again from 1687 to 1688. He was born in Holstein. His older brother Nicolai Esmit preceded him as governor of St. Thomas.

== Biography ==
When Adolph's brother's was proclaimed governor in 1679, Adolph was in Courland, but he quickly went to the West Indies, where he captained a slave ship. When there, Esmit led a faction of planters in opposition of his brother, and deposed him in the fall of 1682. Westergaard describes him as "shifty, shrewd, vain, and at times boastful, and an exceedingly exasperating neighbor to deal with." Meanwhile, his (likely English) wife Charity Esmit was in Copenhagen, securing the official proclamation of his inauguration as governor in 1683.

During his rule, St. Thomas gained a reputation of being a haven for pirates such as George Bond. This was due in part to that when the fact that a sloop owned by a Briton was seized in the harbor of St. Thomas reached Governor Stapleton of Nevis, he attempted having the sloop restored to its owner. He also required the delivery of seven white servants who had run away. Esmit was evasive, saying it was a free port. and Stapleton sent his deputy, Thomas Biss, who said "Sir, if your port is free, why did you seize the sloop? If some rogues have freedom here, why not all?" Esmit later offered to return the sloop, even after having sold it on auction.

Likewise, French pirate Jean Hamlin, being pursued by Jamaican governor Thomas Lynch's men, arrived on St. Thomas in the spring of 1682. Under the protection of Esmit, Hamlin made the island his base and proceeded to rob several English vessels. When Stapleton's men encountered Hamlin's ship in the harbor of St. Thomas, they set it on fire. Although Esmit complained, claiming that the ship had been seized for the Danish Crown, he secretly sold Hamlin a sloop and let him escape the English.

Upon Esmit's arrival in Denmark, he was able to convince Danish West India Company that he could help them locate a sunken Spanish silver transport, and thus avoided the consequences of his rule. He was proclaimed governor again in 1687.

When it turned out that he would not be able to fulfill on his promises, and the citizens would not accept him as their governor, he was brought to Denmark again in 1688. Once there, Esmit managed to evade the impending trial by leaving for Courland.

== Bibliography ==
- Waldemar Westergaard, The Danish West Indies under Company Rule (1671 - 1754) (MacMillan, New York, 1917)
- C. F. Bricka (editor), Dansk biografisk Lexikon, first edition, 19 volumes, 1887–1905, Vol. IV. Online edition available: https://runeberg.org/dbl/4/ (page 599. Numbered as 601 in the online edition).
- Philip Gosse, The Pirates' Who's Who (Plain Label Books). Online edition available
- C.h. Haring, The Buccaneers in the West Indies (Plain Label Books). Online edition available

| Preceded by Nicolai Esmit | Governor of the Danish West Indies; 1683–1684 | Succeeded by Gabriel Milan |
| Preceded by Christopher Heins (ad interim) | Governor of the Danish West Indies; 1687–1688 | Succeeded by Christopher Heins (ad interim) |
