= List of governors of dependent territories in the 18th century =

This is a list of territorial governors in the 18th century (1701–1800) AD, such as the administrators of colonies, protectorates, and other dependencies. Where applicable, native rulers are also listed.

A dependent territory is normally does not have full political independence or sovereignty as a sovereign state yet remains politically outside of the controlling state's integral area. The administrators of uninhabited territories are excluded.

== Austria-Hungary ==
Austria-Hungary
Austro-Hungarian colonies

== Belgium ==
Belgium
Belgian colonial empire

== Britain ==
Kingdom of Great Britain
British colonial empire, English overseas possessions
Monarchs – Prime ministers
- Monarchs
- Prime ministers

=== Americas ===
==== North America ====
- Bermuda

- Governors

- Benjamin Bennett, Governor (1701–1713)
- Henry Pulleine, Governor (1713–1718)
- Benjamin Bennett, Governor (1718–1722)
- John Hope, Governor (1722–1727)
- John Trimingham, Governor (1727–1728)
- John Pitt, Governor (1728–1737)
- Andrew Auchinleck, Governor (1737–1738)
- Alured Popple, Governor (1738–1744)
- Francis Jones, Governor (1744–1747)
- William Popple, Governor (1747–1751)
- Francis Jones, Governor (1751–1755)
- William Popple, Governor (1755–1763)
- Francis Jones, Governor (1763–1764)
- George James Bruere, Governor (1764–1780)
- Thomas Jones, Governor (1780)
- George Bruere the younger, Governor (1780–1781)
- William Browne, Governor (1782–1788)
- Henry Hamilton, Lieutenant governor (1788–1794)
- James Crawford, Governor (1794–1796)
- Henry Tucker, Governor (1796)
- William Campbell, Governor (1796)
- Henry Tucker, Governor (1796–1798)
- George Beckwith, Governor (1798–1803)

- Connecticut Colony

- Governors

- Fitz-John Winthrop, Governor (1698–1707)
- Gurdon Saltonstall, Governor (1708–1724)
- Joseph Talcott, Governor (1724–1741)
- Jonathan Law, Governor (1741–1750)
- Roger Wolcott, Governor (1750–1754)
- Thomas Fitch, Governor (1754–1766)
- William Pitkin, Governor (1766–1769)
- Jonathan Trumbull, Governor (1769–1776)

- Province of Carolina

- Governors

- James Moore, Governor (1700–1703)
- Nathaniel Johnson, Governor (1703–1709)
- Edward Tynte, Governor (1709–1710)
- Robert Gibbes, Governor (1710–1712)
- Charles Craven, Governor (1712)

- Deputy governors, for the northern Carolina

- Henderson Walker, Deputy governor (1699–1703)
- Robert Daniell, Deputy governor (1703–1705)
- Thomas Cary, Deputy governor (1705–1706)
- William Glover, Acting Deputy governor (1706–1708)
- Thomas Cary, Deputy governor (1708–1711)

- Province of North Carolina

- Governors

- Edward Hyde, Governor (1712)

- Province of South Carolina

- Governors

- Charles Craven, Governor (1712–1716)

- Province of Maryland

- Governors

- Nathaniel Blakiston, Governor (1699–1702)
- Thomas Tench, Governor (1702–1704)
- Phillip Calvert, Governor (1704–1709)
- Jesse Wharton, Governor (1709–1714)
- John Hart, Governor (1714–1715)
- John Seymour, Governor (1715–1720)
- Thomas Brooke, Jr., Governor (1720)
- William Joseph, Governor (1720–1727)
- Thomas Lawrence, Governor (1727–1731)
- Samuel Ogle, Governor (1731–1732)
- Charles Calvert, 5th Baron Baltimore, Governor (1732–1733)
- Samuel Ogle, Governor (1733–1742)
- Thomas Bladen, Governor (1742–1746/47 )
- Samuel Ogle, Governor (1746/47–1752 )
- Captain Charles Calvert, Governor (1752–1753)
- Horatio Sharpe, Governor (1753–1769)
- Robert Eden, Governor (1769–1776)

- Province of Massachusetts Bay

- Governors

- William Stoughton, Acting Governor (1700–1701)
- Governor's Council (1701–1702)
- Joseph Dudley, Governor (1702–1715)
- vacant
- William Tailer, Governor (1711–1715)
- Governor's Council (1715)
- Joseph Dudley, Governor (1715)
- William Tailer, Acting Governor (1715–1716)
- Samuel Shute, Governor (1716–1723)
- William Dummer, Acting Governor (1723–1728)
- William Burnet, Governor (1728–1729)
- William Dummer, Acting Governor (1729–1730)
- William Tailer, Acting Governor (1730)
- Jonathan Belcher, Governor (1730–1741)
- vacant
- Spencer Phips, Governor (1732–1757)
- William Shirley, Governor (1741–1749)
- Spencer Phips, Acting Governor (1749–1753)
- William Shirley, Governor (1753–1756)
- Spencer Phips, Acting Governor (1756–1757)
- Governor's Council (1757)
- Thomas Pownall, Governor (1757–1760)
- Thomas Hutchinson, Acting Governor (1760)
- Francis Bernard, Governor (1760–1769)
- Thomas Hutchinson, Acting Governor (1769–1771), Governor (1771–1774)
- Andrew Oliver, Governor (1771–1774)
- vacant
- Thomas Gage, Governor (1774–1775)
- Thomas Oliver, Governor (1774–1776)

- Newfoundland Colony

- Lieutenant Governors of Placentia

- John Moody (governor), Governor (1714–1717)
- Martin Purcell (governor), Governor (1717)
- Samuel Gledhill, Governor (1717–1729)

- Commodore governors

- Henry Osborn, Commodore Governor (1729–1730)
- George Clinton, Commodore Governor (1731)
- Edward Falkingham, Commodore Governor (1732)
- The Viscount Muskerry, Commodore Governor (1733–1734)
- FitzRoy Henry Lee, Commodore Governor (1735–1737)
- Philip Vanbrugh, Commodore Governor (1738)
- Henry Medley, Commodore Governor (1739–1740)
- Thomas Smith, Commodore Governor (1741)
- John Byng (Note: John Byng's elder brother, Robert Byng, was the great-great-grandfather of The Viscount Byng of Vimy, who served as Governor General of Canada from 1921 to 1926.), Commodore Governor (1742)
- Thomas Smith, Commodore Governor (1743)
- Charles Hardy, Commodore Governor (1744)
- Richard Edwards, Commodore Governor (1745)
- James Douglas, Commodore Governor (1746)
- John Bradstreet, Commodore Governor (1747)
- Charles Watson, Commodore Governor (1748)
- George Brydges Rodney, Commodore Governor (1749)
- Francis William Drake, Commodore Governor (1750–1752)
- Hugh Bonfoy, Commodore Governor (1753–1754)
- Richard Dorrill, Commodore Governor (1755–1756)
- Richard Edwards, Commodore Governor (1757–1759)
- James Webb, Commodore Governor (1760)
- Thomas Graves, Commodore Governor (1761–1763)
- Hugh Palliser, Commodore Governor (1764–1768)
- John Byron, Commodore Governor (1769–1771)
- Molyneux Shuldham, Commodore Governor (1772–1774)
- Robert Duff, Commodore Governor (1775)
- John Montagu, Commodore Governor (1776–1778)
- Richard Edwards, Commodore Governor (1779–1781)
- John Campbell, Commodore Governor (1782–1785)
- John Elliot, Commodore Governor (1786–1788)
- Mark Milbanke, Commodore Governor (1789–1791)
- Richard King, Commodore Governor (1792–1793)
- James Wallace, Commodore Governor (1794–1796)
- William Waldegrave, Commodore Governor (1797–1799)
- Charles Pole, Commodore Governor (1800–1801)

- Province of New Hampshire

- Governors

- Richard Coote, 1st Earl of Bellomont, Governor (1697–1701/2)
- Joseph Dudley, Governor (1702–1716)
- Samuel Shute, Governor (1716–1723)
- William Burnet, Governor (1729)
- Jonathan Belcher, Governor (1729–1741)
- Benning Wentworth, Governor (1741–1767)
- John Temple, Governor (1762–1774)
- John Wentworth, Governor (1766–1775)

- Province of New Jersey

- Governors

- Andrew Hamilton, Governor (1699–1702)

- Colony of Rhode Island and Providence Plantations

- Governors

- Samuel Cranston, Governor (1698–1727)
- Joseph Jenckes, Governor (1727–1732)
- William Wanton, Governor (1732–1733)
- John Wanton, Governor (1734–1740)
- Richard Ward, Governor (1740–1743)
- William Greene, Governor (1743–1745)
- Gideon Wanton, Governor (1745–1746)
- William Greene, Governor (1746–1747)
- Gideon Wanton, Governor (1747–1748)
- William Greene, Governor (1748–1755)
- Stephen Hopkins, Governor (1755–1757)
- William Greene, Governor (1757–1758)
- Stephen Hopkins, Governor (1758–1762)
- Samuel Ward, Governor (1762–1763)
- Stephen Hopkins, Governor (1763–1765)
- Samuel Ward, Governor (1765–1767)
- Stephen Hopkins, Governor (1767–1768)
- Josias Lyndon, Governor (1768–1769)
- Joseph Wanton, Governor (1769–1775)
- Nicholas Cooke, Governor (1775–1778)

- Colony of Virginia

- Governors

- George Hamilton, Governor (1698–1737)

- Francis Nicholson, Lieutenant Governor (1698–1705)
- Edward Nott, Lieutenant Governor (1705–1706)
- Edmund Jenings, Acting Governor (1706–1710)
- General Robert Hunter, Lieutenant Governor (1707)
- Alexander Spotswood, Lieutenant Governor (1710–1722)
- Hugh Drysdale, Lieutenant Governor (1722–1726)
- Robert Carter, President of the Council (1726–1727)
- William Gooch, Lieutenant Governor (1727–1740)

- Willem Anne van Keppel, Governor (1737–1754)

- James Blair, Acting Governor (1740–1741)
- William Gooch, Lieutenant Governor (1741–1749)
- Thomas Lee, Acting Governor (1749–1750)
- Lewis Burwell I/II, Acting Governor (1750–1751)
- Robert Dinwiddie, Lieutenant Governor (1751–1756)

- John Campbell, Governor (1756–1759)

- Robert Dinwiddie, Lieutenant Governor (1756–1758)
- Francis Fauquier, Lieutenant Governor (1758–1768)

- Jeffery Amherst, Governor (1759–1768)

- John Blair, Sr., Acting Governor (1768)

- Norborne Berkeley, Baron de Botetourt, Governor (1768–1770)
- William Nelson, Acting Governor (1770–1771)
- John Murray, Governor (1771–1775)

==== Caribbean ====
- Colony of the Bahamas

- Governors

- Elias Haskett, Governor (1700–1701)
- Ellis Lightfoot, Governor (1701–1703)
- Edward Birch, Governor (1704)
- without British rule: see Republic of Pirates
- Woodes Rogers, Governor (1718–1721)
- George Phenney, Governor (1721–1728)
- Woodes Rogers, Governor (1729–1732)
- Richard Fitzwilliam, Acting Governor (1734–1738)
- John Tinker, Governor (1741–1758)
- John Gambier, Acting Governor (1758–1760)
- William Shirley, Governor (1760–1775)
- Montfort Browne, Governor (1775–1776)
- John Gambier, Acting Governor (1776–1778)
- John Robert Maxwell, Governor (1780–1782)
- Spanish occupation (1782–1783)
- Andrew de Vau, Acting Governor (1783)
- John Robert Maxwell, Governor (1783–1784)
- James Edward Powell, Lieutenant governor (1784–1786)
- John Brown, Acting Governor (1786–1787)
- John Murray, 4th Earl of Dunmore, Governor (1787–1796)
- Robert Hunt, Acting Governor (1796–1797)
- John Forbes, Lieutenant governor (1797)
- William Dowdeswell, Governor (1797–1801)

- Barbados

- Governors

- Ralph Grey, Governor (1697–1701)
- John Farmer, Acting Governor (1701–1703)
- Bevil Granville, Governor (1703–1706)
- Mitford Crow, Governor (1707–1710)
- George Lillington, Acting Governor (1710–1711)
- Robert Lowther, Governor (1711–1720)
- William Sharpe, Acting for Lowther (1714–1715)
- John Frere, Acting Governor (1720–1721)
- Samuel Cox, Acting Governor (1721–1722)
- Henry Worsley, Governor (1722–1727)
- Thomas Catesby Paget, Governor (1727–1731)
- James Dotin, Acting Governor (1731)
- Walter Chetwynd, Governor (1731–1732)
- Emanuel Howe, Governor (1733–1735)
- James Dotin, Acting Governor (1735–1737)
- Orlando Bridgeman, Governor (1737–1738)
- Humphrey Howarth, Governor (1738)
- Thomas Gage, Governor (1738–1739)
- Robert Byng, Governor (1739–1740)
- James Dotin, Acting Governor (1740)
- Thomas Robinson, Governor (1742–1747)
- Henry Grenville, Governor (1747–1756)
- Charles Pinfold, Governor (1756–1766)
- Samuel Rous, Acting Governor (1766–1768)
- William Spry, Governor (1768–1772)
- Samuel Rous, Acting Governor (1772)
- Edward Hay, Governor (1772–1779)
- John Dotin, Acting Governor (1779–1780)
- James Cunninghame, Governor (1780–1782)
- John Dotin, Acting Governor (1783–1784)
- David Parry, Governor (1784–1793)
- William Bishop, Acting Governor (1793–1794)
- George Poyntz Ricketts, Governor (1794–1800)
- William Bishop, Acting Governor (1800–1801)

- Cayman Islands, overseas territory

- Chief magistrates

- William Cartwright, Chief magistrate (1750–1776)
- William Bodden, Chief magistrate (1776–1823)

- British Grenada

- Governors

- George Scott, Governor (1762–1764)

- Colony of Jamaica

- Governors

- William Beeston, Acting Governor (1693–1699), Governor (1699–1702)
- William Selwyn, Governor (1702)
- Peter Beckford, Acting Governor (1702)
- Thomas Handasyde, Acting Governor (1702–1704), Governor (1704–1711)
- Archibald Hamilton, Governor (1711–1716)
- Peter Heywood, Governor (1716–1718)
- Nicholas Lawes, Governor (1718–1722)
- Henry Bentinck, Governor (1722–1726)
- John Ayscough, Acting Governor (1726–1728)
- Robert Hunter, Governor (1728–1734)
- John Ayscough, Acting Governor (1734–1735)
- John Gregory, Acting Governor (1735)
- Henry Cunningham, Governor (1735–1736)
- John Gregory, Acting Governor (1736–1738)
- Edward Trelawny, Governor (1738–1752)
- Charles Knowles, Governor (1752–1756)
- Henry Moore, Acting Governor (1756)
- George Haldane, Governor (1756–1759)
- Henry Moore, Acting Governor (1759–1762)
- William Henry Lyttelton, Governor (1762–1766)
- Roger Hope Elletson, Governor (1766–1767)
- William Trelawny, Governor (1767–1772)
- John Dalling, Acting Governor (1772–1774)
- Basil Keith, Governor (1774–1777)
- John Dalling, Governor (1777–1781)
- Archibald Campbell, Acting Governor (1781–1783), Governor (1783–1784)
- Alured Clarke, Governor (1784–1790)
- Thomas Howard, Governor (1790–1791)
- Adam Williamson, Acting Governor (1791–1795)
- Alexander Lindsay, Governor (1795–1801)

==== South America ====
- Falkland Islands

- Governors

- John McBride, HMS Jason, Governor (1767–1768)
- Rayner, Governor (1768–1769)
- Anthony Hunt, HMS Tamar, Governor (1769–1770)
- George Farmer, Governor (1770)
- John Burr, HMS Hound, Governor (1771–1772)
- Samuel Wittewrong Clayton, Governor (1773–1776)

=== Asia ===
- Ceylon – Frederick North, Governor of Ceylon (1798–1805)
- Madras – Edward Clive, Governor of Madras (1798–1803)

=== Australia ===
- New South Wales –

- John Hunter, Governor of New South Wales (1795–1800)
- Philip Gidley King, Governor of New South Wales (1800–1806)

=== British isles ===
- Guernsey, Crown dependency

- British monarchs are the Dukes of Normandy
- Governors

- Charles Churchill, Governor (1706–1714)
- Giles Spencer, Governor (1711)
- Daniel Harvey, Governor (1715–1732)
- Lewis Dollon, Governor (1726)
- George Cholmondeley, Governor (1732–1733)
- Richard Sutton, Governor (1733–1737)
- François de La Rochefoucauld, Governor (1737–1739)
- Thomas Fermor, Governor (1739–1742)
- Algernon Seymour, Governor (1742–1750)
- John Ligonier, Governor (1750–1752)
- John West, Governor (1752–1766)
- Richard Lyttelton, Governor (1766–1770)
- Jeffery Amherst, Governor (1770–1797)
- Charles Grey, Governor (1797–1807)

- Bailiffs

- Edmund Andros, Bailiff (1674–1713)
- Jean de Sausmarez, Bailiff (1714–1728)
- Josué Le Marchant, Bailiff (1728–1751)
- Eleazar Le Marchant, Bailiff (1752–1758)
- Samuel Bonamy, Bailiff (1758–1771)
- William Le Marchant, Bailiff (1771–1800)
- Robert Porrett Le Marchant, Bailiff (1800–1810)

- Kingdom of Ireland, effectively a client state of England (to 1706) / Great Britain (1707–1800)

- British monarchs are the Monarchs of Ireland
- Lord Lieutenant of Ireland

- The Earl of Rochester: 28 December 1700
- The Duke of Ormonde: 19 February 1703
- The Earl of Pembroke: 30 April 1707
- The Earl of Wharton: 4 December 1708
- The Duke of Ormonde: 26 October 1710
- The Duke of Shrewsbury: 22 September 1713
- The Earl of Sunderland: 21 September 1714
- Lords Justices: 6 September 1715
- The Viscount Townshend: 13 February 1717
- The Duke of Bolton: 27 April 1717
- The Duke of Grafton: 18 June 1720
- The Lord Carteret: 6 May 1724
- The Duke of Dorset: 23 June 1730
- The Duke of Devonshire: 9 April 1737
- The Earl of Chesterfield: 8 January 1745
- The Earl of Harrington: 15 November 1746
- The Duke of Dorset: 15 December 1750
- The Duke of Devonshire: 2 April 1755
- The Duke of Bedford: 3 January 1757
- The Earl of Halifax: 3 April 1761
- The Earl of Northumberland: 27 April 1763
- The Viscount Weymouth: 5 June 1765
- The Earl of Hertford: 7 August 1765
- The Earl of Bristol: 16 October 1766 (did not assume office)
- The Viscount Townshend: 19 August 1767
- The Earl Harcourt: 29 October 1772
- The Earl of Buckinghamshire: 7 December 1776
- The Earl of Carlisle: 29 November 1780
- The Duke of Portland: 8 April 1782
- The Earl Temple: 15 August 1782
- The Earl of Northington: 3 May 1783
- The Duke of Rutland: 12 February 1784
- The Marquess of Buckingham: 27 October 1787
- The Earl of Westmorland: 24 October 1789
- The Earl FitzWilliam: 13 December 1794
- The Earl Camden: 13 March 1795
- The Marquess Cornwallis: 14 June 1798

=== Mediterranean ===
- Gibraltar

- Governors

- Prince George of Hesse-Darmstadt, Governor (1704–1704)
- Henry Nugent, Governor (1704)
- John Shrimpton, Governor (1704–1707)
- Roger Elliott, Governor (1707–1711)
- Thomas Stanwix, Governor (1711–1713)
- David Colyear, Governor (1713–1720)
- Richard Kane, Governor (1720–1727)
- Jasper Clayton, Governor (1727–1730)
- Joseph Sabine, Governor (1730–1739)
- Francis Columbine, Governor (1739–1740)
- William Hargrave, Governor (1740–1748/9)
- Humphrey Bland, Governor (1748/9–1754)
- Thomas Fowke, Governor (1754–1756)
- James O'Hara, Governor (1756–1757)
- William Home, Governor (1757–1761)
- John Toovey, Acting Governor (1761)
- John Parslow, Acting Governor (1761)
- Edward Cornwallis, Governor (1761–1776)
- John Irwin, Acting Governor (1765–1767)
- Robert Boyd, Acting Governor (1776–1777)
- George Augustus Eliott, Governor (1777–1790)
- Robert Boyd, Acting Governor (1790)
- Robert Boyd, Governor (1790–1794)
- Henry Clinton, Governor (1794–1795)
- Charles Rainsford, Governor (1794–1795)
- Charles O'Hara, Governor (1795–1802)

- Malta Protectorate

- Alexander Ball, Civil Commissioner of Malta (1799–1801)

== Courland and Semigallia ==
Duchy of Courland and Semigallia
Couronian colonies

== Denmark-Norway ==
Danish West India Company, Denmark–Norway
Danish colonial empire
- Monarchs

- Danish West Indies

- Governors of St. Thomas and St. John

- Johan Lorensen (1693–1702)
- Claus Hansen, Governor (1702–1706)
- Joachim Melchior von Holten, Governor (1706–1708)
- Diderich Mogensen, Interim Governor (1708–1710)
- Mikkel Knudsen Crone, Governor (1710–1716)
- Erich Bredal, Governor (1716–1724)
- Friderich Moth, Governor (1724–1727)
- Hendrich von Suhm, Governor (1727–1733)
- Phillip Gardelin, Governor (1733–1736)
- Friderich Moth, Governor (1736–1744)
- Jacob Schönemann, Governor (1740–1744)
- Christian von Schweder, Governor (1744–1747)
- Christian Suhm, Governor (1747–1758)
- Christian Leberecht von Prøck, Governor general (1756–1766)

- Governors of St. Croix

- Friderich Moth, Governor of St. Croix (1735–1747)
- Gregers Høg Nissen, Chief ad interim of St. Croix (1736–1744)
- Paul Lindemark, Chief ad interim of St. Croix (1744–1747)
- Jens Hansen, Governor of St. Croix (1747–1751)
- Peter Clausen, Governor of St. Croix (1751–1758)

- Governors of St. Thomas, St. John, and St. Croix

- Christian Leberecht von Prøck, Governor general (1758–1766)

- Harrien Felschauer, Governor of St. Thomas & St. John (1758–1760)
- Johan Georg von John, Governor of St. Thomas & St. John (1760–1764)
- Ditlev Wilhelm Wildthagen, Governor of St. Thomas & St. John (1764)
- Peter Gynthelberg, Governor of St. Thomas & St. John (1764–1765)
- Ulrich Wilhelm Roepstorff, Governor of St. Thomas & St. John (1765–1766)

- Peter Clausen, Governor general (1766–1771)

- Jens Nielsen Kragh, Governor of St. Thomas, St. John (1766–1773)

- Frederick Moth, Governor general (1770–1772)
- Ulrich Wilhelm von Roepstorff, Governor general (1772–1773)
- Henrik Ludvig Ernst von Schimmelmann, Governor general (1773)

- Thomas de Malleville, Governor of St. Thomas, St. John (1773–1796)

- Peter Clausen, Governor general (1773–1784)
- Henrik Ludvig Ernst von Schimmelmann, Governor general (1784–1787)
- Ernst Frederik von Walterstorff, Governor general (1787–1794)
- Wilhelm Anton Lindemann, Governor general (1794–1796)
- Thomas de Malleville, Governor general (1796–1799)

- Balthazar Frederik Mühlenfels, Governor of St. Thomas, St. John (1796–1800)

- Wilhelm Anton Lindemann, Governor general (1799–1801)

- Casimir Wilhelm von Scholten, Governor of St. Thomas, St. John (1800–1801)

== France ==
Ancien Régime of France, Kingdom of France (1791–92), French First Republic
French colonial empire
- Heads of state
- Prime ministers

Caribbean

- French Grenada

- Governors

- Jean Le Comte, Governor (1649–1654)
- Louis Cacqueray de Valminière, Governor (1654–1658)
- Dubuc, Governor (1658)
- Jean Faudoas de Cérillac, Governor (1658–1664)
- Vincent, Governor (1664–1670)
- Louis de Canchy de Lerole, Governor (1671–1674)
- Pierre de Sainte-Marthe de Lalande, Governor (1675–1679)
- Jacques de Chambly, Governor (1679–1680)
- Nicholas de Gabaret, Governor (1680–1689)
- Louis Ancelin de Gemostat, Governor (1690–1695)
- Jean-Léon Fournier de Carles de Pradine, Governor (1695?–1696?)
- De Bellair de Saint-Aignan, Governor (1696–1700)

Mediterranean

- French Malta

- Claude-Henri Belgrand de Vaubois, Military Governor of Malta (1798–1800)

North America

- New France

- Governors general (See also)

- Louis-Hector de Callière, Governor general (1698–1703)
- Philippe de Rigaud Vaudreuil, Governor general (1703–1725)
- Charles de la Boische, Marquis de Beauharnois, Governor general (1725–1747)
- Roland-Michel Barrin de La Galissonière, Governor general (1747–1749)
- Jacques-Pierre de Taffanel de la Jonquière, Marquis de la Jonquière, Governor general (1749–1752)
- Michel-Ange Duquesne de Menneville, Governor general (1752–1755)
- Pierre François de Rigaud, Marquis de Vaudreuil-Cavagnal, Governor general (1755–1760)

- Placentia, Newfoundland

- Governors

- Joseph de Monic, Governor (1697–1702)
- Daniel d'Auger de Subercase, Governor (1702–1706)
- Philippe Pastour de Costebelle, Governor (1706–1713)

Oceania

- Falkland Islands

- Louis Antoine de Bougainville, Governor (1764–1767)

== Germany ==
German Empire
German colonial empire

== Italy ==
Italy
Italian colonial empire

== Japan ==
Empire of Japan
Japanese colonial empire

== Netherlands ==
Dutch Republic, Batavian Republic
Dutch colonial empire
- Monarchs
- Prime ministers

Asia

- Dutch East Indies

- Governors general

- Willem van Outhoorn, Governors general (1691–1704)
- Joan van Hoorn, Governors general (1704–1709)
- Abraham van Riebeeck, Governors general (1709–1713)
- Christoffel van Swoll, Governors general (1713–1718)
- Hendrick Zwaardecroon, Governors general (1718–1725)
- Mattheus de Haan, Governors general (1725–1729)
- Diederik Durven, Governors general (1729–1732)
- Dirck van Cloon, Governors general (1732–1735)
- Abraham Patras, Governors general (1735–1737)
- Adriaan Valckenier, Governors general (1737–1741)
- Johannes Thedens, Governors general (1741–1743)
- Gustaaf Willem van Imhoff, Governors general (1743–1750)
- Jacob Mossel, Governors general (1750–1761)
- Petrus Albertus van der Parra, Governors general (1761–1775)
- Jeremias van Riemsdijk, Governors general (1775–1777)
- Reynier de Klerck, Governors general (1777–1780)
- Willem Arnold Alting, Governors general (1780–1796)
- Pieter Gerardus van Overstraten, Governors general (1796–1801)

== Oman ==
Yaruba dynasty, Al Said of Oman
- Monarchs

- Mombasa

- Walis

- Nasr ibn Abdallah al-Mazru‘i, Wali (1698–1728)
- unknown Wali (1729–1735)
- Sa‘id al-Hadermi, Wali (1735–1739)
- Muhammad ibn Uthman al-Mazru‘i, Wali (1739–1745)
- ‘Ali ibn Uthman al-Mazru‘i, Wali (1746)

== Ottoman Empire ==
Ottoman Empire
Eyalets and Vilayets
- Sultans
- Grand viziers

== Portugal ==
Kingdom of Portugal
Portuguese colonial empire
Monarchs

=== Africa ===
- Angola – Miguel António de Melo, Governor of Angola (1797–1802)
- Portuguese Cape Verde

- Governors

- António Salgado, Governor (1698–1702)

- João Cardoso Pizarro, Governor (1676–1676)

- Jorge Cotrim de Mello, Governor (1702–1702)
- Gonçalo de Lemos Mascarenhas, Governor (1702–1707)
- Rodrigo de Oliveira da Fonseca, Governor (1707–1710)
- José Pinheiro da Câmara, Governor (1710–1715)
- Manuel Pereira Calheiros e Araújo, Governor (1715–1715)
- Serafim Teixeira Sarmento de Sá, Governor (1715–1719)
- Balthasar de Sousa Coutinho, Governor (1719–1720)
- António Vieira, Governor (1720–1725)
- Francisco Miguel da Nóbrega Vasconcelos, Governor (1726–1728)
- Francisco de Oliveira Grans, Governor (1728–1733)
- Bento Gomes Coelho, Governor (1733–1737)
- José da Fonseca Barbosa, Governor (1736–1738)
- Chamber Senate (1738–1741)
- João Zuzarte de Santa Maria, Governor (1741–1751)
- António José d'Eça e Faria, Governor (1751–1751)
- Luís António da Cunha d'Eça, Governor (1752–1756)
- Manuel António de Sousa e Meneses, Governor (1756–1761)
- Marcelino Pereira de Ávila, Governor (1761–1761)
- António de Barros Bezerra, Governor (1761–1764)
- Bartolomeu de Sousa de Brito Tigre, Governor (1764–1766)
- João Jácome de Brito Barena Henriques, Governor (1766–1767)
- Joaquim Salema Saldanha Lobo, Governor (1768–1777)
- António do Vale de Sousa e Meneses, Governor (1777–1781)
- Duarte de Melo da Silva Castro de Almeida, Governor (1781–1782)
- Francisco de São Simão, Acting Governor (1782–1783)
- António Machado de Faria e Maia, Governor (1784–1789)
- Francisco José Teixeira Carneiro, Governor (1789–1793)
- José da Silva Maldonado d'Eça, Governor (1793–1795)
- Marcelino António Bastos, Governor (1796–1802)

- Portuguese Moçambique

- Governors

- Jácome de Morais Sarmento, Governor (1699–1703)
- João Fernandes de Almeida, Governor (1703–1706)
- Luís de Brito Freire, Governor (1706–1708)
- Luís Gonçalves da Câmara, Governor (1708–1712)
- João Fernandes de Almeida, Governor (1712–1714)
- Francisco de Mascarenhas, Governor (1714–1716)
- Francisco de Souto-Maior, Governor (1716–1719)
- Francisco de Alarcão e Souto-Maior, Governor (1719–1722)
- Álvaro Caetano de Melo e Castro, Governor (1722–1723)
- António João Sequeira e Faria, Governor (1723–1726)
- António Cardim Fróis, Governor (1726–1730)
- António Casco de Melo, Governor (1730–1733)
- José Barbosa Leal, Governor (1733–1736)
- Nicolau Tolentino de Almeida, Governor (1736–1740)
- Lourenço de Noronha, Governor (1740–1743)
- Pedro do Rêgo Barreto da Gama e Castro, Governor (1743–1746)
- Caetano Correia da Sá, Governor (1746–1750)
- Francisco de Melo e Castro, Governor (1750–1752)

- Colony of Moçambique, the Zambezi and Sofala

- Francisco de Melo e Castro, Governor (1752–1758)
- João Manuel de Melo, Governor (1758)
- David Marques Pereira, Governor (1758–1759)
- Pedro de Saldanha e Albuquerque, Governor (1759–1763)
- João Pereira da Silva Barba, Governor (1763–1765)
- Baltasar Manuel Pereira do Lago, Governor (1765–1779)
- Provisional administration, (1779–1780)
- José de Vasconcelos e Almeida, Governor (1780–1781)
- Vicente Caetano da Maria e Vasconcelos, Acting Governor (1781–1782)
- Pedro de Saldanha e Albuquerque, Governor (1782)
- Provisional administration, (1782–1786)
- António de Melo e Castro, Governor (1786–1793)
- Diogo de Sousa Coutinho, Governor (1793–1797)
- Francisco Guedes de Carvalho Meneses da Costa, Governor (1797–1801)

- Portuguese São Tomé

- Governors

- Manuel António Pinheiro da Câmara, Governor (1697–1702)
- José Correia de Castro, Governor (1702–1709)
- Vicente Dinis Pinheiro, Governor (1709)
- French Junta (1709–1715)
- Bartolomeu da Costa Ponte, Governor (1715–1716)
- Chamber Senate (1716–1717)
- António Furtado Mendonça, Governor (1717–1720)
- Junta (1720–1722)
- José Pinheiro da Câmara, Governor (1722–1727)
- Serafim Teixeira Sarmento, Governor (1727–1734)
- Lopo de Sousa Coutinho, Governor (1734–1736)
- José Caetano Soto Maior, Governor (1736–1741)
- António Ferrão de Castelo Branco, Governor (1741)
- Chamber Senate (1741–1744)
- Francisco Luís da Conceição, Governor (1744)
- Francisco de Alva Brandão, Acting Governor (1744–1745)
- Francisco Luís das Chagas, Governor (1747–1748)
- Chamber Senate (1748–1751)
- António Rodrigues Neves, Governor (1751)
- Chamber Senate (1751–1753)

- Portuguese São Tomé and Príncipe

- Governors

- Chamber Senate (1753–1755)
- Lopo de Sousa Coutinho, Governor (1755)
- Chamber Senate (1755–1758)
- Luís Henrique da Mota e Mele, Governor (1758–1761)
- Chamber Senate (1761–1767)
- Lourenço Lôbo de Almeida Palha, Governor (1767–1768)
- Chamber Senate (1768–1770)
- Vicente Gomes Ferreira, Governor (1770–1778)
- João Manuel de Azambuja, Governor (1778–1782)
- Cristóvão Xavier de Sá, Governor (1782–1788)
- João Resende Tavares Leote, Governor (1788–1797)
- Inácio Francisco de Nóbrega Sousa Coutinho, Governor (1797)
- Manuel Monteiro de Carvalho, Acting Governor (1797)
- Varela Borca, Governor (1797–1798)
- Manuel Francisco Joaquim da Mota, Governor (1798–1799)
- Francisco Rafael de Castelo de Vide, Governor (1799)
- João Baptista de Silva, Governor (1799–1802)

=== Asia ===
- Portuguese Macau –

- D. Cristovao Pereira de Castro, Governor of Macau (1797–1800)
- José Manuel Pinto, Governor of Macau (1800–1803)

== Russia ==
Russian Empire: Russian colonial empire

== Spain ==
Bourbon Spain
Spanish colonial empire
- Monarchs
- Prime ministers

- Spanish Netherlands

- Governors

- Eugene of Savoy, Governor (1716–1724)
- Wirich Philipp von Daun, Governor (1725)
- Maria Elisabeth of Austria, Governor (1725–1741)
- Friedrich August von Harrach-Rohrau, Governor (1741–1744)
- Maria Anna of Austria, Governor (1744)
- Charles Alexander of Lorraine, Governor (1744–1780)
- Maria Christina of Austria-Lorraine with Albert Casimir of Saxony, Governor (1781–1793)
- Charles of Austria-Lorraine, Governor (1793–1794)

- Viceroyalty of New Granada – Pedro Mendinueta y Múzquiz, Viceroy of New Granada (1797–1803)
- Viceroyalty of New Spain (complete list) —

- José Sarmiento de Valladares, Viceroy (1696–1701)
- Juan Ortega y Montañés, Viceroy (1696, 1701–1702)
- Francisco Fernández de la Cueva, Viceroy (1702–1711)
- Fernando de Alencastre, Viceroy (1711–1716)
- Baltasar de Zúñiga, Viceroy (1716–1722)
- Juan de Acuña, Viceroy (1722–1734)
- Juan Antonio de Vizarrón y Eguiarreta, archbishop & viceroy (1734–1740)
- Pedro de Castro y Figueroa, Viceroy (1740–1741)
- Pedro Malo de Villavicencio, President of the Royal Court & interim viceroy (1741–1742)
- Pedro Cebrián, Viceroy (1742–1746)
- Juan Francisco de Güemes, Viceroy (1746–1755)
- Agustin Ahumada y Villalon, Viceroy (1755–1769)
- Francisco Antonio de Echávarri, President of the Royal Court and interim viceroy (1760)
- Francisco Cajigal de la Vega, interim viceroy (1760)
- Joaquín de Montserrat, Viceroy (1760–1766)
- Carlos Francisco de Croix, Viceroy (1766–1771)
- Antonio María de Bucareli, Viceroy (1771–1779)
- Francisco Romá y Rosell, Regent of the Royal Court & interim viceroy (1779)
- Martín de Mayorga, interim viceroy (1789–1783)
- Matías de Gálvez, Viceroy (1783–1784)
- Vicente de Herrera y Rivero, Regent of the Royal Court & Interim Viceroy (1784–1785)
- Bernardo de Gálvez, Viceroy (1785–1786)
- Eusebio Sánchez Pareja, Regent of the Royal Court & Interim Viceroy (1786–1787)
- Alonso Núñez de Haro y Peralta, archbishop & viceroy (1787)
- Manuel Antonio Flórez, Viceroy (1787–1789)
- Juan Vicente de Güemes, Viceroy (1789–1794)
- Miguel de la Grúa Talamanca, Viceroy (1794–1798)
- Miguel José de Azanza, Viceroy (1798–1800)
- Félix Berenguer de Marquina (1800–1803)

- Captaincy General of Cuba – Salvador de Muro y Salazar, Governor of Cuba (1799–1812)
- Spanish East Indies – Rafael María de Aguilar y Ponce de León, Governor-General of the Philippines (1793–1806)
- Commandancy General of the Provincias Internas – Pedro da Nava, Commandant General of the Interior Provinces (1793–1802)
- Viceroyalty of Peru – Ambrosio O'Higgins (1796–1801)

- Captaincy General of Chile – Joaquín del Pino y Rozas, Royal Governor of Chile (1799–1801)

- Viceroyalty of the Río de la Plata – Gabriel de Avilés, Viceroy of the Río de la Plata (1799–1801)
- Falkland Islands

- Governors

- Felipe Ruíz Puente, Governor (1767–1773)
- Domingo Chauria, Governor (1773–1774)
- Francisco Gil Lemos, Governor (1774–1777)
- Ramón de Carassa, Governor (1777–1779)
- Salvador de Medina, Governor (1779–1781)
- Jacinto de Altolaguirre, Governor (1781–1783)
- Fulgencio Montemayor, Governor (1783–1784)
- Augustín Figueroa, Governor (1784–1786)
- Pedro de Mesa y Casto, Governor (1786–1787)
- Ramón Clairac, Governor (1787–1788)
- Pedro de Mesa y Casto, Governor (1788–1789)
- Ramón Clairac, Governor (1789–1790)
- Juan José de Elizalde, Governor (1790–1791)
- Pedro Pablo Sanguinetto, Governor (1791–1792)
- Juan José de Elizalde, Governor (1792–1793)
- Pedro Pablo Sanguinetto, Governor (1793–1794)
- José Aldana Ortega, Governor (1794–1795)
- Pedro Pablo Sanguinetto, Governor (1795–1796)
- José Aldana Ortega, Governor (1796–1797)
- Luis de Medina Torres, Governor (1797–1798)
- Francisco Javier de Viana, Governor (1798–1799)
- Luis de Medina Torres, Governor (1799–1800)
- Francisco Javier de Viana, Governor (1800–1801)

== Sweden ==
Sweden
Swedish colonies

== United States ==
- United States: United States territorial acquisitions
- State of Franklin: unrecognized and unauthorized territory (August 1784 – December 1788)

- John Sevier, President/Governor (December 1784 – December 1788)

- Territory of the United States South of the River Ohio: organized incorporated territory (May 26, 1790 – June 1, 1796). Became the State of Tennessee.

- William Blount, Governor (September 20, 1790 – March 30, 1796) Arrived 10 October 1790.

- Territory Northwest of the River Ohio: organized incorporated territory (July 13, 1787 – March 1, 1803).

- Arthur St. Clair, Governor (July 15, 1788 – December 14, 1802)

- District of Columbia:

- Board of Commissioners of the Federal City (22 January 1791 – 1 July 1802)

- Thomas Johnson (January 22, 1791 – August 23, 1794)
- David Stuart (January 22, 1791 – September 12, 1794)
- Daniel Carroll (March 4, 1791 – May 21, 1795)
- Gustavus Scott (August 23, 1794 – December 25, 1800)
- William Thornton (September 12, 1794 – July 1, 1802)
- Alexander White (May 21, 1795 – July 1, 1802)

- Mississippi Territory: organized incorporated territory (April 7, 1798 – December 10, 1817)

- Governor

- Winthrop Sargent (18 August 1798 – 7 May 1801) Appointed 7 May 1798, arrived 6 August 1798.

- Indiana Territory: organized incorporated territory (July 4, 1800 – December 11, 1816)

- Governor

- Major General William Henry Harrison, Military governor (January 10, 1801 – December 28, 1812). Harrison was the 9th President of the United States (March 4, 1841 – April 4, 1841)

== See also ==
- List of state leaders in the 18th century
- List of state leaders in the 18th-century Holy Roman Empire
- List of state leaders in 18th-century British South Asia and its predecessor states
