= Christian Henrik Arendrup =

His Excellency Christian Henrik Arendrup K.D.R.E.
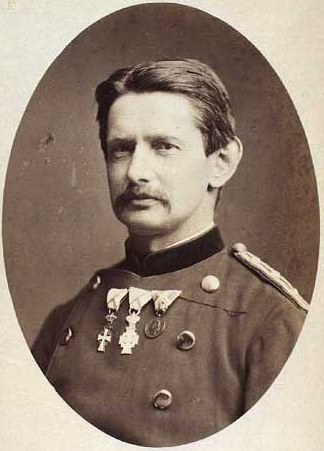
- Christian Henrik Arendrup (1837–1913)

Governor-General of The Danish West Indies
- In office 15 April 1881 – 22 December 1893
- Preceded by: Janus August Garde
- Succeeded by: Carl Emil Hedemann

Personal details
- Born: 25 March 1837 Jutland, Denmark
- Died: 8 July 1913 (aged 76) Copenhagen, Denmark
- Resting place: Garnisons Cemetery
- Spouse: Almira Kjellerup (m. 14 April 1863)
- Children: Anders A. Kjellerup, former councilor in the Danish West Indies
- Parents: Christian Rasmus Arendrup (1803–1871) (father); Nanna Marie Henne (1811–1899) (mother)
- Relatives: Brothers: Søren Adolph Arendrup, a Danish army officer; Albert Arendrup, a Danish army officer; Emil Peter Ussing Arendrup, medical doctor; Herluf Arendrup
- Education: Sorø Academy, boarding school (grad. 1856); Royal Institute of Technology of the Royal Danish Military Academy (1857–1859)
- Occupation: Politician, Military Officer
- Civilian awards: Honorary Knights Grand Cross of the Royal Victorian Order

Military service
- Allegiance: Denmark
- Branch/service: Royal Danish Army
- Years of service: 1859–1881, 1893–1905
- Rank: Major General
- Battles/wars: Dybbøl
- Military awards: Knight of Dannebrog

Christian Henrik Arendrup (25 March 1837 – 1913) was Governor-General of the Danish West Indies from 1881 to 1893.

== Biography ==
Arendrup was born at Frederikshavn in Jutland, Denmark. He was the son of Christian Rasmus Arendrup, councilor of Fyens Stift, and Nanna Marie Henne, the daughter of a marine Commander.

=== Education ===
In 1856, Arendrup graduated from Sorø Academy (Sorø Akademi) on the island of Zealand and the following year, he started at the Royal Danish Military Academy (Hærens Officersskole) where he graduated as Engineering Second Lieutenant à la suite. He went to Fredericia in 1861 to join preparations for the impending war with the German Confederation.

=== Second Schleswig War ===
Among his accomplishments in 1864 during the Second Schleswig War were helping the defense during the battles at Dybbøl and the Als Island. Arendrup was named Knight of Dannebrog and promoted to premier lieutenant for his achievements.

When sea mines started to be used abroad, Arendrup was installed as an assistant to work on the Danish mine command under Major C. F. N. Schrøder .

=== Governor of the Danish West Indies ===
On 1 April 1881, Colonel Arendrup was pronounced Governor of the Danish West Indies. He landed on St Thomas on 15 April 1881. By the Colonial Law of 27 November 1883 he was required to reside six months a year in St. Thomas and the other half a year in St. Croix.

=== Later life ===
In 1893 he left the governor's post. He was promoted to Major General in 1900 and re-entered as Chief Inspector and Head of the Engineering Corps. He was dismissed from the military service in 1905. He was appointed an Honorary Knight Grand Cross of the Royal Victorian Order by King Edward VII on the occasion of the King's visit to Copenhagen. He worked as the chairman of Danish Red Cross.

=== Family ===
Arendrup was married to Almira Kjellerup (1841–1924), the daughter of Anders A. Kjellerup, former councilor in the Danish West Indies.

== Bibliography ==
- Waldemar Westergaard, The Danish West Indies under Company Rule (1671–1754) (MacMillan, New York, 1917)
- C. F. Bricka (editor), Dansk biografisk Lexikon, first edition, 19 volumes, 1887–1905, Vol. I. Online edition available: https://runeberg.org/dbl/1/ (page 312. Numbered as 330 in the online edition).

Political offices
Preceded by Janus August Garde	Governor of the Danish West Indies; 1881–1893	Succeeded by Carl Emil Hedemann
