= Ernst Frederik Walterstorff =

Danish colonial official (1755–1820)

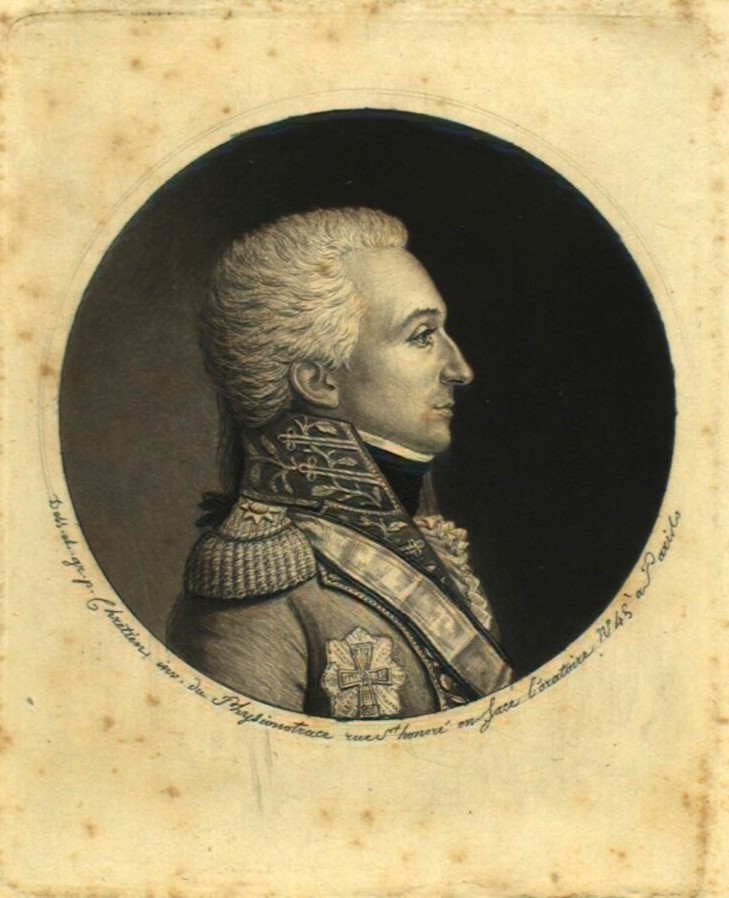

Governor of the Danish West Indies
- In office 31 December 1787 – 25 July 1794
- Monarch: Christian VII of Denmark
- Preceded by: Henrik Ludvig Ernst von Schimmelmann
- Succeeded by: Wilhelm Anton Lindemann
- In office 16 February 1802 – 16 February 1803
- Monarch: Christian VII of Denmark
- Preceded by: Henrik Ludvig Ernst von Schimmelmann
- Succeeded by: Wilhelm Anton Lindemann

Personal details
- Born: 1 April 1755 Tønder, Denmark
- Died: 13 October 1820 (aged 65) Paris, France
- Spouse: Sara Heyliger (m. 1787)

Ernst Frederik Walterstorff (1 April 1755 – 13 March 1820) served as Governor-General of the Danish West Indies from 1788 to 1794 and again from 1802 to 1803. Back in Denmark, he was appointed as a director of the General Post Office (Generalpostamtet) and the Royal Danish Theatre. In 1810, he was appointed as Danish envoy in Paris.

== Early life and education ==
Walterstorff was born on 1 April 1755 in Rønder, the son of ritmester and later infantry major Christian Walterstorff (1725–1801) and Barbara Maria Munthe (1727–1802). At an early age, he became a page in the Royal Danish court (then the center of Denmark–Norway). He enrolled at the University of Copenhagen in 1777 and the same year passed his legal exams. He then briefly worked as an assistant (auskultant) in Generaltoldkammeret.

== Career ==
=== Danish West Indies ===
in 1778 Walterstorff moved to the Danish West Indies after being appointed as a member of the Government Council for three years. In 1780–1786, he also served as a district judge (landsdommer) on Saint Croix. In 1782, he became a chamberlain (kammerherre). In 1783, he was awarded a considerable sum from the Ad Usus Publicos Foundation for an account of his travels in the Danish West Indies and England in the service of Danish trade interests. In 1787, he was promoted to vice governor of the Danish West Indies. On 31 December 1787, he succeeded Henrik Ludvig Ernst von Schimmelmann as governor-general of the islands. In 1790, he was awarded the rank of major general. On 25 July 1794, he was himself succeeded by Wilhelm Anton Lindemann as governor-general of the Danish West Indies.

=== Career in Copenhagen ===
In 1796, after completing a journey to North America, he returned to Denmark. Back in Copenhagen, he was appointed as director of Generalpostamtet. In 1797, he was appointed as one of several directors of Postpensionskassen, the postal pension fund. He is credited with having instigated, based on inspiration from North America, a passenger transportation system by way of stagecoaches in Denmark.

From 1798 to 1801, alongside Jens Baggesen, he also served as director of the Royal Danish Theatre. During the same period, he also served as president of Landhusholdningsselskabet.

=== Diplomatic career ===
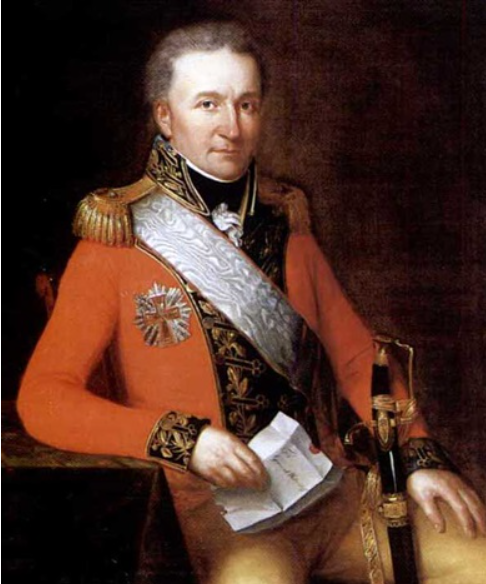
Ernst Frederik von Walterstorff

Walterstorff was on several occasions charged with diplomatic missions. These activities intensified during the war years after the turn of the century. He was for instance entrusted with representing Denmark in the negotiations with Lord Nelson for a possible ceasefire. In late 1801 he was also sent back to the Danish West Indies as chief-in-command in connection with the return of the islands after the British occupation. In 1803, he returned to Copenhagen and resumed his administrative obligations. In 1807, during the Battle of Copenhagen, despite lacking advanced military training, he acted as head of the Nordre Sjællandske Landeværnsregiment. He was also charged with representing Denmark in the negotiations for a Danish capitulation. Later the same year, he was court-martialed for his conduct. In November 1808, he was found partially guilty. In 1809, he was dismissed from all his administrative posts.

In 1810, Walterstorff was appointed as Danish minister in Paris.

== Personal life ==
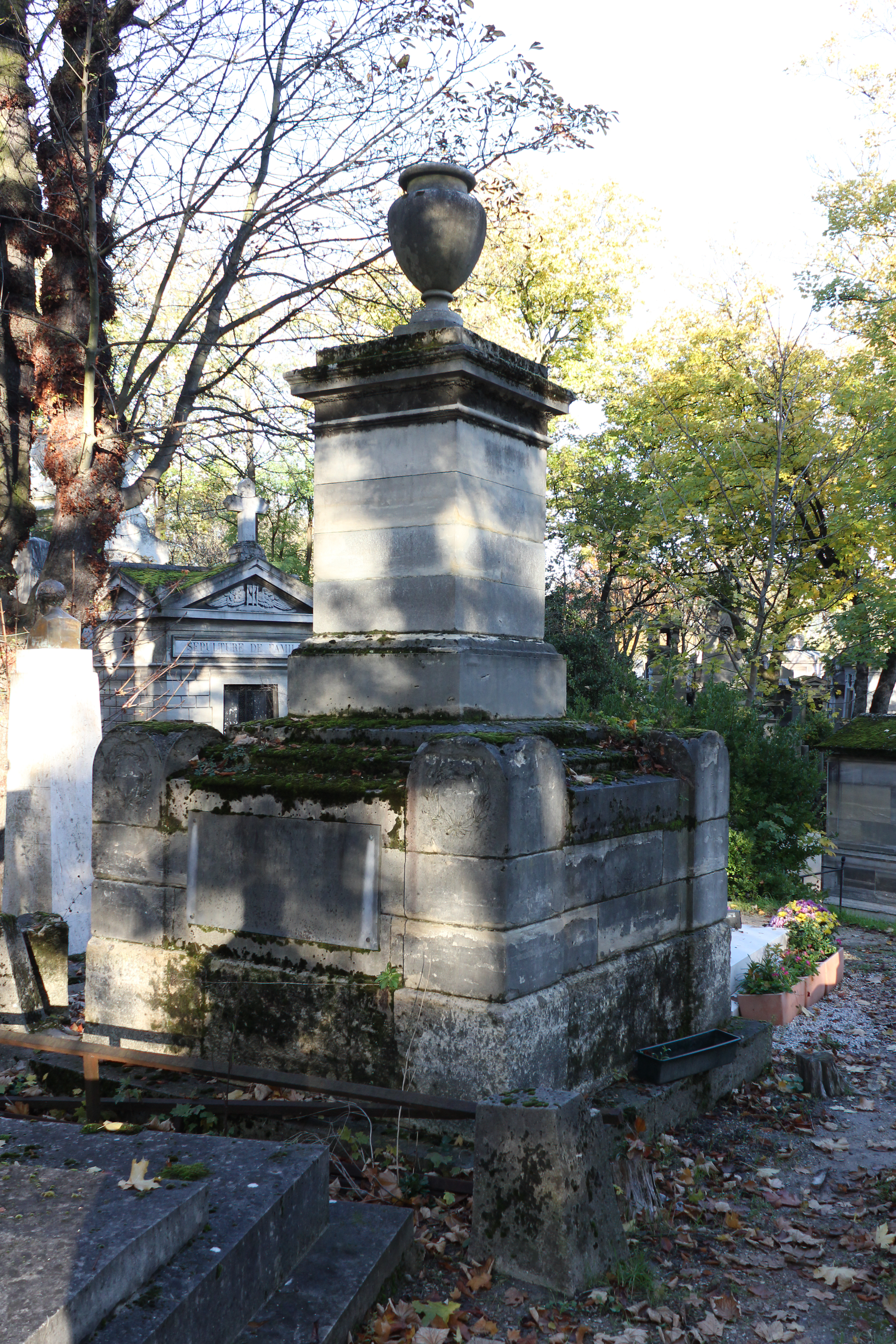
Walterstorff 's grave in Paris

Walterstorff was married to Sara Heyliger Cortwright (died 1839) on 31 May 1787 on Saint Croix, daughter of local planter Cornelius Kortright and Elizabeth Hendrichsen. They had one son, Christian Cortwright von Walterstorff (1790–1823). At the time of the 1801 census, Walterstorff resided with his family in a rented apartment at Store Kongensgade 81 in Copenhagen. From 1799 to 1806, he was the owner of the country house Kokkedal north of Copenhagen.

He died on 13 March 1820 in Paris and is buried in the city's Père Lachaise Cemetery.

== Awards ==
On leaving the army in 1809, in 1811 he was appointed as lieutenant-general à la suite. He became a White Knight in Hv.R. 1801 and awarded the Order of Merit in 1812. In 1819, he became a count. The comital line of the family died with his son in 1923.
