= Carl Adolph Rothe =

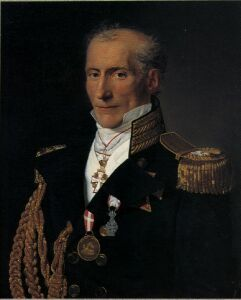
- Born: 8 December 1767; Tybjerggård, Zealand, Denmark
- Died: 12 July 1834 (aged 66); Copenhagen, Denmark
- Burial place: Holmen Cemetery
- Military career
- Allegiance: Denmark–Norway; Denmark
- Branch: (Denmark) Royal Dano-Norwegian Navy (Denmark) Royal Danish Navy
- Service years: 1778-1834
- Rank: Counter-Admiral
- Unit: Prinds Christian Frederik
- Commands: Nyborg
- Conflicts: French Revolutionary Wars; War of the Second Coalition; Battle of Copenhagen (1801); Napoleonic Wars; Gunboat War; Battle of Zealand Point

Governor-General of the Danish West Indies
- In office 16 October 1820 – 5 July 1822
- Preceded by: Johan Henrik von Stabel
- Succeeded by: Johan Frederik Bardenfleth

Counter-Admiral Carl Adolph Rothe (8 December 1767 – 12 July 1834) was a Danish naval officer and colonial administrator who served as the Governor-General of the Danish West Indies from 1820 to 1822.

== Biography ==
Rothe was born on 8 December 1767 in Tybjerggård on Zealand, Denmark, to parents Tyge Jesper Rothe and Karen Bjørn. The Rothe family originates from Germany, coming to Denmark in the end of the 17th century. On 12 January 1811 he married Benedicte Ulfsparre de Tuxen (1790-1877) in Helsingør, the daughter of Louis de Tuxen and Charlotte Elisabeth Klingfeldt. The couple had no less than eight children: Louis, Anna Rosine, Andrea Bjørn, Karen, Charlotte Elisabeth, Martha Gustava, Margrethe Christine and Louise.

Rothe joined the Danish navy as a naval volunteer (cadet) in 1778 and on 2 April 1783 he was commissioned as an officer in the rank of a Second Lieutenant. In his naval career Rothe, fought in the Battle of Copenhagen in 1801 against the British fleet, commanding the ship (pram) Nyborg. He was promoted to the rank of Captain in 1806, and served as the second in command of the ship Prinds Christian Frederik under the command of captain Carl W. Jessen from 24 December 1807. He participated in the Battle of Zealand Point on 22 March 1808, which he survived as the second in command of Prinds Christian Frederik. After that battle, in which he was wounded, he spent two months as an English prisoner of war in Gothenburg, Sweden.

He was promoted to the rank of counter admiral as of 16 April 1833. From 11 November 1808 until 25 July 1814 Carl was governor of Bornholm and Christiansø, and was the governor of the Virgin Islands in the Danish West Indies from 1820 to 1822. He died, 66 years old, in Copenhagen on 12 July 1834. He is buried in Holmens Cemetery.

== Notes ==
Political offices
Preceded by Adrian Benjamin Bentzon	Governor of the Danish West Indies; 1820–1822	Succeeded by Johan Frederik Bardenfleth
