= List of governors of the Danish West Indies =

Governor-General of the Danish West Indies
- Danish: Generalguvernør for Dansk Vestindien
- Flag of Denmark / Denmark–Norway (until 1814)

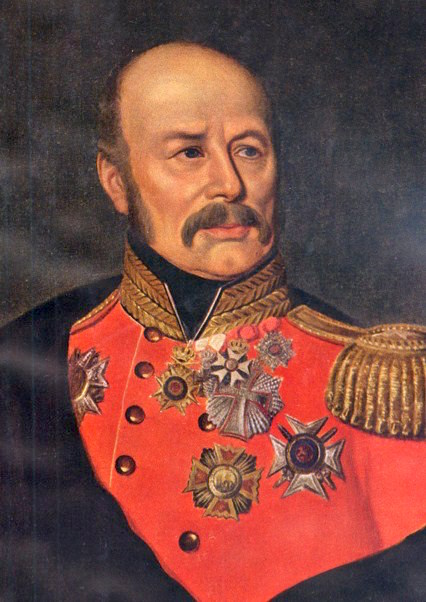
- Longest in office Peter Carl Frederik von Scholten; 14 July 1827 – 6 July 1848
- Residence: Government House, Christiansted
- Nominator: Prime Minister of Denmark
- Appointer: Monarch of Denmark
- Precursor: None
- Formation: 1756; 270 years ago
- First holder: Christian Leberecht von Prøck
- Final holder: Henri Konow (acting)
- Abolished: 31 March 1917; 109 years ago
- Succession: Governor of the United States Virgin Islands

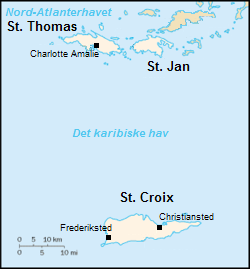
Map of the Danish West Indies, in Danish language.

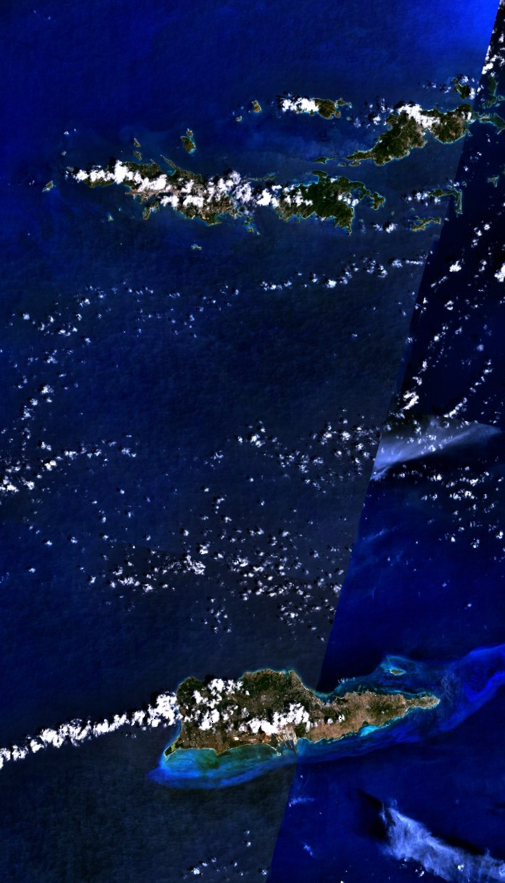
Satellite image of the U.S. Virgin Islands, taken by NASA's satellite Landsat 7.

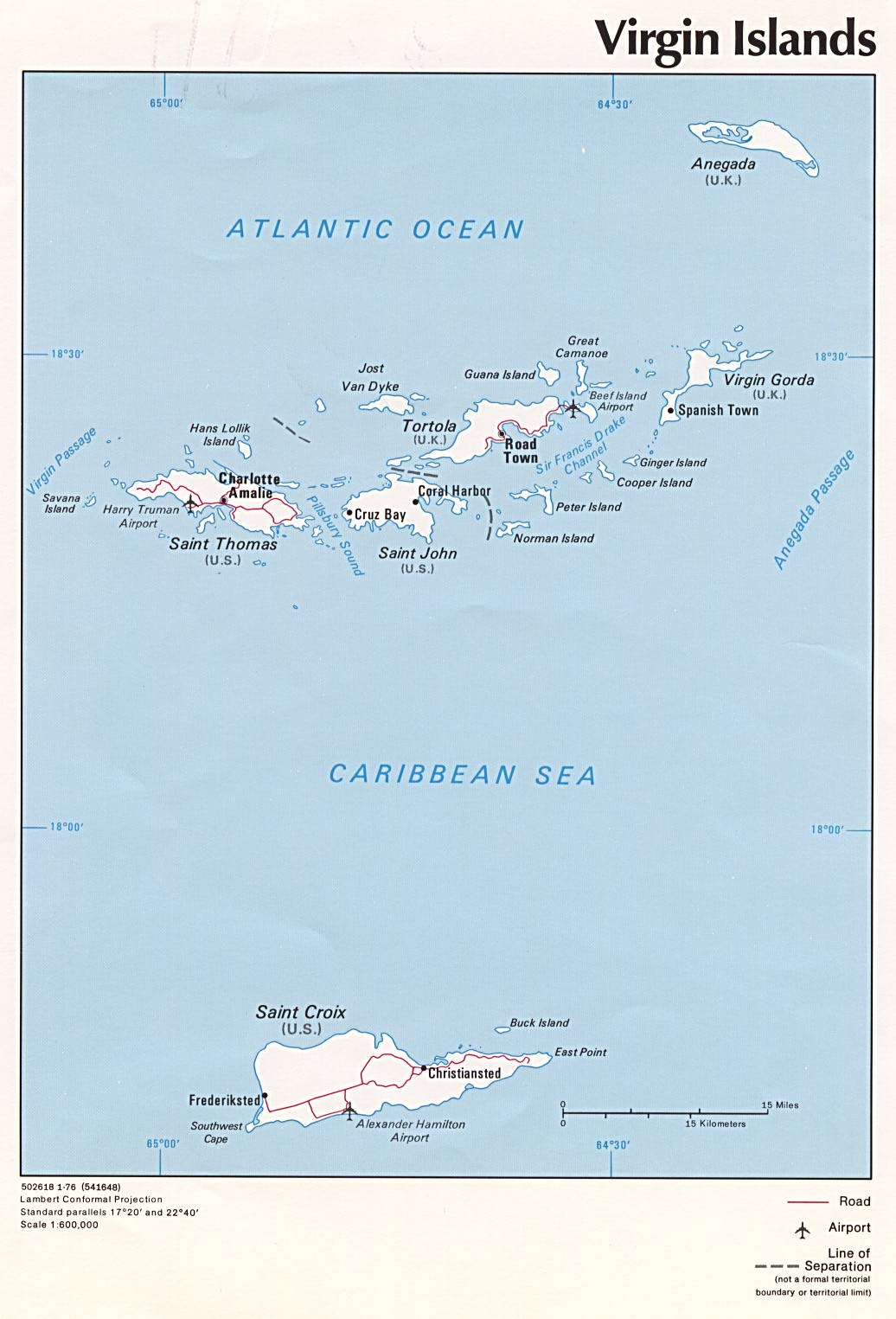
A 1976 political map of U.S. and British Virgin Islands, produced by the CIA.

Map of Spanish (green), U.S. (red) and British (blue) Virgin Islands.

This article lists the governors of the Danish West Indies (Danish: Dansk Vestindien) or Danish Antilles or Danish Virgin Islands, a Danish colony in the Caribbean encompassing the territory of the present-day United States Virgin Islands.

== Governors of St. Thomas ==
St. Thomas was claimed by Denmark–Norway in 1665.

	Portrait	Incumbent	Term	Notes
1		Erik Nielson Smit	6 May 1665 – 12 June 1666	
2		Kjeld Jensen Slagelse	c. 1666	
3		Jørgen Iversen Dyppel	25 May 1672 – 4 July 1680	
4		Nicolai Esmit	4 July 1680 – November 1682	
5		Adolph Esmit	November 1680 – 7 May 1684	

== Governors of St. Thomas and St. John ==
St. John (St. Jan) was claimed by Danish West India Company in 1683, which was disputed by the British until 1718.

	Portrait	Incumbent	Term	Notes
1		Gabriel Milan	7 May 1684 – 27 February 1686	
2		Mikkel Mikkelsen (interim)	27 February 1686 – 29 June 1686	
3		Christopher Heins	29 June 1686 – March 1687	
4		Adolph Esmit (interim)	March 1687 – October 1688	Second term
5		Christopher Heins	October 1688 – October 1689	Second term
6		Johan Lorensen	October 1689 – 17 September 1692	
7		Frans de la Vigne	17 September 1692 – 7 April 1693	
8		Johan Lorensen	7 April 1693 – 19 February 1702	Second term
9		Claus Hansen	19 February 1702 – 8 February 1706	
10		Joachim Melchior von Holten	8 February 1706 – 21 December 1708	
11		Diderich Mogensen	21 December 1708 – 1710	
12		Mikkel Knudsen Crone	1710 – 8 August 1716	
13		Erik Bredal	8 August 1716 – April 1724	During his term St. John was occupied.
14		Friderich Moth	April 1724 – May 1727	
15		Henrich von Suhm	May 1727 – 21 February 1733	
16		Phillip Gardelin	21 February 1733 – 21 February 1736	During his term there was a slave rebellion.
17		Friderich Moth	21 February 1736 – 13 April 1744	Second term. Also governor of St. Croix (see below).
18		Jacob Schönemann	1740 – 1744	
19		Christian von Schweder	13 April 1744 – 25 April 1747	
20		Christian Suhm	25 April 1747 – 1758	
21		Harrien Felschauer	1758 – 1760	
22		Johan Georg von John	1760 – April 1764	
23		Ditlev Wilhelm Wildthagen	April 1764 – November 1764	
24		Peter Gynthelberg	November 1764 – 1765	
25		Ulrich Wilhelm de Roepstorff	1765 – 1766	Later Governor-General (see below).
26		Jens Nielsen Kragh	1766 – 1773	
27		Thomas de Malleville	1773 – 1796	Later Governor-General (see below).
28		Balthazar Frederik Mühlenfels	1796 – 1800	Later Governor-General (see below).
29		Casimir Wilhelm von Scholten	1800 – March 1801	
30		John Clayton Cowell	31 March 1801 – 27 March 1802	British occupation.
31		Willum von Rømeling	27 March 1802 – 1803	
32		Casimir Wilhelm von Scholten	1803 – December 1807	Second term
33		Fitzroy J. Grafton McLean	December 1807 – 20 November 1815	British occupation.
34		Christian Ludvig von Holten	20 November 1815 – 1818	
35		Peter Carl Frederik von Scholten	1818 – 1820	Later Governor-General (see below).
36		Christian Ludvig von Holten |valign=top|February 1820 – March 1820	Second term	
37		Peter Carl Frederik von Scholten	April 1820 – July 1820	Second term
38		Carl Gottlieb Fleischer	1820 – 1822	
39		Carl Wilhelm Jessen	1822 – 1823	
40		Peter Carl Frederik von Scholten	1823 – 1826	Third term
41		Johannes Søbøtker	1826 – 1829	
42		Frederik Ludvig Christian Pentz Rosenørn	1829 – 1830	
43		Lewin Jürgen Rohde; Acting	1830-1830	
44		Frederik Ludvig Christian Pentz Rosenørn	1830 - 1831	
45		Lewin Jürgen Rohde; Acting	1831 - 1832	
46		Frederik Ludvig Christian Pentz Rosenørn	1832 – 1834	
47		Frederik Oxholm	1834 – 1836	
48		Johannes Søbøtker	1836 – 1848	Second term
49		Hans Henrik Berg	1848	
50		Frederik Oxholm	1848 – 1852	Second term
51		Hans Henrik Berg	1853 – 1862	Second term

== Governors of St. Croix ==
St. Croix was bought from French West India Company in 1733.

No.	Portrait	Name (Birth–Death)	Term of office		
No.	Portrait	Name (Birth–Death)	Term start	Term end	Time in office
1		Frederik Moth (1694–1746)	16 November 1733	20 February 1736	2 years, 96 days
–		Gregers Høg Nissen (1709–1772); Acting	24 February 1736	16 April 1744	8 years, 52 days
–		Paul Lindemark Jørgensen; Acting	16 April 1744	15 May 1747	3 years, 29 days
2		Jens Hansen (1719–1758)	15 May 1747	22 December 1751	4 years, 221 days
3		Peter Clausen (1721–1784)	22 December 1751	6 August 1755	3 years, 227 days

In 1754, the Danish West Indies were sold by Danish West India Company to King Frederick V, becoming royal Dano-Norwegian colonies. Hereafter, St. Croix was governed by the Governors-General of the Danish West Indies.

== Governors-general of the Danish West Indies ==
No.	Portrait	Name (Birth–Death)	Term of office		
No.	Portrait	Name (Birth–Death)	Term start	Term end	Time in office
Governor-general
1		Christian Leberecht von Prøck (1718–1780)	6 August 1755	7 August 1766	11 years, 1 day
2		Peter Clausen (1721–1784)	7 August 1766	4 May 1770	3 years, 270 days
3		Frederik Christian Moth (1730–1808)	4 May 1770	1 March 1772	1 year, 302 days
4		Ulrich Wilhelm de Roepstorff (1729–1821)	1 March 1772	31 July 1773	1 year, 152 days
–		Henrik Ludvig Ernst von Schimmelmann (1743–1793); Acting	31 July 1773	27 October 1773	88 days
(2)		Peter Clausen (1721–1784)	27 October 1773	24 June 1784 †	10 years, 329 days
5		Henrik Ludvig Ernst von Schimmelmann (1743–1793)	25 June 1784	31 December 1787	3 years, 189 days
6		Ernst Frederik Walterstorff (1755–1820)	31 December 1787	25 July 1794	6 years, 206 days
7		Wilhelm Anton Lindemann (1739–1801)	25 July 1794	8 May 1796	1 year, 288 days
8		Thomas de Malleville (1739–1798)	8 May 1796	26 October 1798	2 years, 171 days
(7)		Wilhelm Anton Lindemann (1739–1801)	26 October 1798	31 March 1801	2 years, 156 days
(6)		Ernst Frederik Walterstorff (1755–1820)	16 February 1802	16 February 1803	1 year, 0 days
9		Balthazar Frederik Mühlenfels (?–1807)	16 February 1803	22 March 1807	4 years, 34 days
10		Hans Christopher Lillienskjøld (1762–1837)	22 March 1807	25 December 1807 (Note: Deposed in the Invasion of the Danish West Indies.)	278 days
British occupation
–		Henry Bowyer	25 December 1807	1 April 1815	7 years, 97 days
End of British occupation
11		Peter Lotharius Oxholm (1753–1827)	1 April 1815	1 May 1816	1 year, 30 days
–		Johan Henrik von Stabel (1774–1831); Acting	1 May 1816	1 July 1816	61 days
12		Adrian Benjamin Bentzon (1777–1827)	1 July 1816	26 June 1819	2 years, 360 days
–		Johan Henrik von Stabel (1774–1831); Acting	26 June 1819	16 October 1820	1 year, 112 days
13		Carl Adolph Rothe (1767–1834)	16 October 1820	5 July 1822	1 year, 262 days
14		Johan Frederik Bardenfleth (1772–1833)	5 July 1822	14 July 1827	5 years, 9 days
15		Peter Carl Frederik von Scholten (Note: During his tenure Johannes Søbøtker served as acting Governor-General: 24 April 1831 – 18 July 1832, 22 March 1834 – 28 January 1835) (1784–1854)	14 July 1827	6 July 1848	20 years, 358 days
–		Frederik Oxholm (1801–1871); Acting	6 July 1848	27 November 1848	144 days
Government Commissioner
16		Peder Hansen (1798–1880)	27 November 1848	24 June 1851	2 years, 209 days
Governor
17		Hans Ditmar Frederik Feddersen (1805–1863)	24 June 1851	27 April 1855	3 years, 307 days
18		Johan Frederik Schlegel (1817–1896)	27 April 1855	31 May 1860	5 years, 34 days
19		Vilhelm Ludvig Birch (1817–1896)	31 May 1860	25 February 1871	10 years, 270 days
–		John Christmas (1799–1873); Acting	26 February 1871	30 June 1871	124 days
–		Frantz Bille (1832–1918); Acting	30 June 1871	1 July 1872	1 year, 1 day
–		Johan August Stakeman (1805–1891); Acting	1 July 1872	24 September 1872	85 days
20		Janus August Garde (1823–1893)	25 September 1872	23 March 1881	8 years, 179 days
21		Christian Henrik Arendrup (1837–1913)	15 April 1881	22 December 1893	12 years, 251 days
22		Carl Emil Hedemann (1852–1929)	22 December 1893	17 April 1903	9 years, 116 days
23		Herman August Jürs (1838–1918)	17 April 1903	21 January 1904	279 days
24		Frederik Theodor Martin Mortensen Nordlien	22 January 1904	2 April 1905	1 year, 70 days
25		Christian Cold (1863–1934)	27 April 1905	21 February 1908	4 years, 25 days
26		Peter Carl Limpricht (1838–1912)	21 February 1908	4 August 1911	3 years, 164 days
27		Christian Helweg-Larsen (1860–1934)	7 November 1911	3 October 1916	5 years, 60 days
–		Henri Konow (1862–1939); Acting	3 October 1916	31 March 1917	179 days

The Danish West Indies were sold by Denmark to the United States on 12 December 1916. The administration was officially turned over on 31 March 1917, and the first US governor was Navy Captain Edwin Taylor Pollock. For governors of the territory after the establishment of the US administration, see List of governors of the United States Virgin Islands.

== See also ==
- History of the United States Virgin Islands
- Danish colonization of the Americas
- 1868 Danish West Indies status referendum
- 1916 Danish West Indies status referendum
- 1916 Danish West Indian Islands sale referendum
- Treaty of the Danish West Indies
- Transfer Day

== Bibliography ==
- Waldemar Westergaard, The Danish West Indies under Company Rule (1671 – 1754) (MacMillan, New York, 1917)
- World Statesmen. Retrieved 6 April 2006
