= Governor Moody =

Governor Moody may refer to:

- Dan Moody (1893–1966), 30th Governor of Texas
- John Moody (British Army officer) (died 1736), Deputy Governor of Placentia from 1714 to 1717
- Richard Clement Moody (1813–1887), Colonial Governor of the Falkland Islands from 1841 to 1848
- Zenas Ferry Moody (1832–1917), 7th Governor of Oregon

== See also ==
- Thomas H. Moodie (1878–1948), 19th Governor of North Dakota
