= Erik Bredal (governor) =

Norwegian-Danish colonial administrator

Erik (Erich) Pedersen Bredal (1683 – c. 1741) was a Norwegian-Danish colonial administrator who served as Governor of St. Thomas and St. Jan from 1716 to 1724.

== Early life and education ==
Bredal was baptized on 24 November at Brønnøy Church, Norway. His father was the local pastor Peder Erichsen Bredal (1651–1714), son of bishop Erik Bredal. His mother was Margrethe Thomesdatter Meier (1660–1695). His parents were married on 9 October 1673. Bredal received his secondary schooling in Bergen before enrolling at the University of Copenhagen in July 1697. In June 1702, he was briefly back in Brønnøy, preaching as studentiosus on the second day of Pentecost (5 June 1702) in the absence of his father.

== Colonial administrator ==
Bredal landed on St. Thomas on 9 May 1713. He spent the next three years as secretary, bookkeeper and member of the Government Council (Secrete Råd). On 12 August, following the death of governor Michel Crones (8 March 1716), St. Thomas, he was elected as interim governor of the islands. His appointment was later confirmed by the directors of the Danish West India Company in Copenhagen. On 29 April 1719, he was also appointed as deputy commandant of Christiansfort. In April 1724, he was dismissed by the DQC directors in Copenhagen. He was succeeded by Frederik Moth.

== Personal life and legacy ==
Bredal married Aletta van Beverhoudt c. 1718, daughter of Lucas van Beverhoudt, a planter from the Netherlands Antilles, and Margaretha, née Runnels. His wife's sister Anna Elisabeth was married to Bredal's successor Friederich Moth.

Bredal owned several houses and plantations on St. Thomas and St. Jan. In 1724, he purchased Hassel Island from Daniel Jansen. After a few years, he sold it to Friderich Moth.

Bredal's fate is uncertain. He travelled to Europe in 1730, leaving his wife and children behind on the island, never to return. He is known to have visited Denmark and several other European destinations but is considered dead as of at least 1741. Aletta van Beverhoudt filed for divorce after seven years of absence. It is unclear whether the marriage was actually dissolved.
