= Henrik Ludvig Ernst von Schimmelmann =

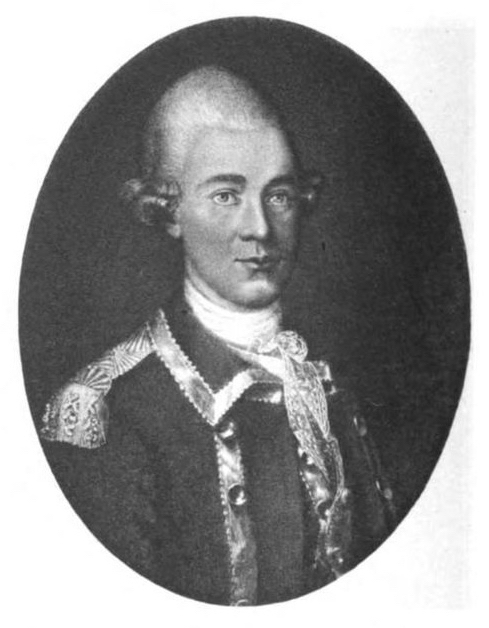
Henrik Ludvig Ernst von Schimmelmann

Heinrich Ludvig Ernst von Schimmelmann (10 September 1743 - 4 December 1793) was a German-Danish colonial administrator. He served as governor-general of the Danish West Indies from 1784 to 1787. Prior to that, he had briefly also served as acting governor-general of the islands in 1773.

== Early life ==
Schimmelmann was born in Gross-Luckow, the son of Konsistorialraad Jacob Schimmelmann and Margrethe Sabine, née Neye. His paternal uncle was Heinrich Carl von Schimmelmann, in whose house in Hamburg he spent some years as a young man. In 1765, Schimmelmann came to Copenhagen where he served as chief bookkeeper for his uncle.

== Danish West Indies ==
In 1768, Schimmelmann was sent to the Danish West Indies to manage his uncle's plantations. On 7 September 1771, he was made a member of the Secretary Council (det sekrete Raad) on Saint Croix with the title of justitsråd. On 16 June 1772, he was given permission by the Kommercekollegiet to travel to Europe. He was in Copenhagen with former governor-general Peter Clausen. On 8 July 1773, after being recommended by Clausen, he was appointed 3rd member of the Government Council.

On 24 May 1773, with the rank of colonel lieutenant, Schimmelmann was appointed as governor of Saint Croix (vice governor). In late May, he returned to the Danish West Indies on board the Minerva. He landed on Saint Croix on 22 July. From 31 July to 27 October, following Ulrich Wilhelm de Roepstorff's dismissal, a direct consequence of Johann Friedrich Struensee's fall, Schimmelmann served as acting governor-general of the islands. He left the post following Clausen's return to the islands. On 25 June 1784, he succeeded Clausen as governor-general. In 1785, he was promoted to major-general. He left the post as governor-general on 31 December 1787. He was succeeded by Ernst Frederik Walterstorff.

== Personal life ==
Schimmelmann married on 19 September 1775 on Saint Croix to Henriette Cathrine Schäffer (née Lexmond, died 1816). He was the brother-in-law of Johan Friedrich Heinrich.

Schimmelmann was ennobled in 1780. He returned to Denmark in the late 1780s. In 1790, he bought Skodsborg House from Johannes Søbøtker.

He died on 4 December 1793 in Copenhagen and is buried at Garrison Cemetery. His wife kept Skodsborg until 1808.
