= Adrian Benjamin Bentzon =

Governor of the Danish West Indies

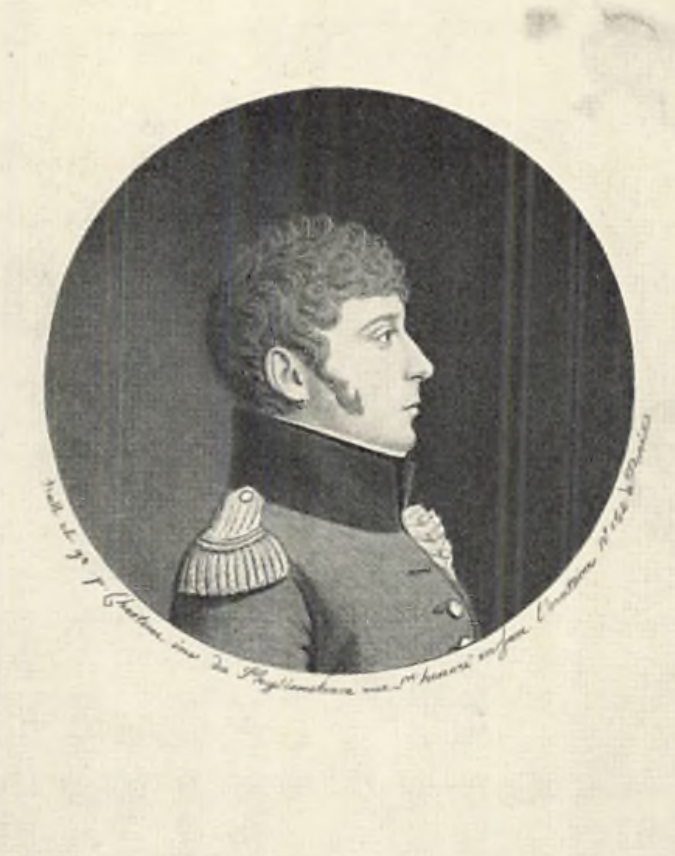
- Born: 22 April 1777; Tønsberg, Norway
- Died: 15 January 1827 (aged 49); Christiansted, St. Croix, Danish West Indies
- Education: Bergen Cathedral School; University of Copenhagen
- Occupations: Attorney, civil servant
- Employers: Governor of the Danish West Indies
- Spouse: Magdalena Astor (m. 1807; div. 1819)
- Relatives: John Jacob Astor (father-in-law)

Adrian Benjamin Bentzon (22 April 1777 – 15 January 1827) was Governor of the Danish West Indies from 1816 to 1820.

== Biography ==
He was born in Tønsberg, Norway. He was the son of Hans Jacob Bentzon (1739–1810) and Sophia Hedvig Købke (1755–1810). He graduated from Bergen Cathedral School in 1793 and took his legal exams in 1798 at the University of Copenhagen. He was later adjunct and notary of the legal faculty. In 1814, he became part of the government of the Danish West Indies. In 1816, he was Governor at the level of Major General. He was named as Commander of the Order of the Dannebrog in 1817. In 1820, he became embroiled in scandal, and resigned as governor, but in 1825, he was acquitted by the Supreme Court of Denmark.

== Personal life ==
In 1807, Bentzon was married to Magdalena Astor (1788–1832), daughter of John Jacob Astor. The marriage was not happy, their two children died, and she lived for several years with her parents in New York City. In 1819, Bentzon was granted a divorce. She subsequently married Rev. John Bristed (1778–1855).

Bentzon died during 1827 at Christiansted, St. Croix.

Political offices
Preceded by Johan Henrik von Stabel	Governor of the Danish West Indies; 1816–1820	Succeeded by Carl Adolph Rothe
