= Estate Little Princess =

- U.S. National Register of Historic Places
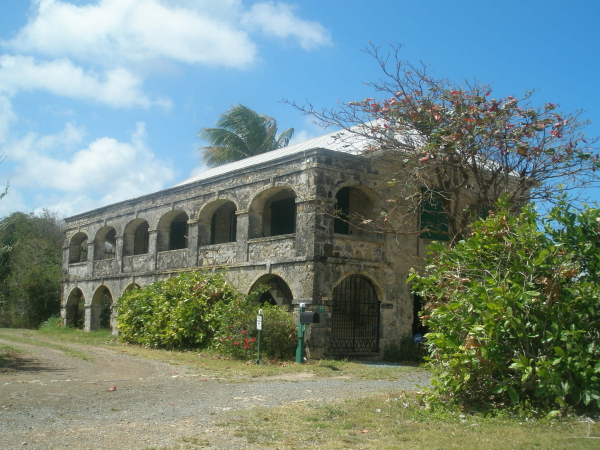
- The Danish hospital building, now an office of The Nature Conservancy

- Location within Saint Croix, U.S. Virgin Islands Location within the U.S. Virgin Islands
- Nearest city: Christiansted, Virgin Islands
- Coordinates: 17°45′24″N 64°43′32″W
- Area: 19.6 acres (7.9 ha)
- Built: 1749
- NRHP reference No.: 80003995
- Added to NRHP: June 9, 1980

Estate Little Princess is a historic plantation site located northwest of Christiansted in Saint Croix, U.S. Virgin Islands. It was first owned by governor Frederik Moth in 1738 and rests on 25 acres of land (from the original 200 acres). As of 2011 the estate is under ownership of The Nature Conservancy and serves as headquarters for the Eastern Caribbean/Virgin Islands programs. The property has been turned into a nature preserve and historical tours are given as well. The site was listed on the National Register of Historic Places on June 9, 1980.

There are many buildings on the property, including a building that served as a Danish hospital and the great house, which was built in the 1800s. Both have been partially restored. Estate Little Princess was primarily a sugar and rum factory hundreds of years ago. There are many ruins (such as a windmill and remnants of the factory) located on the grounds of the estate. In the great house, a small exhibition with photographs, maps and other documents tells the history of the estate. Access is via the minor road leading north-west from the intersection of VI75 (Northside road) and VI74 (Rattan road) 2km northwest of Christiansted.

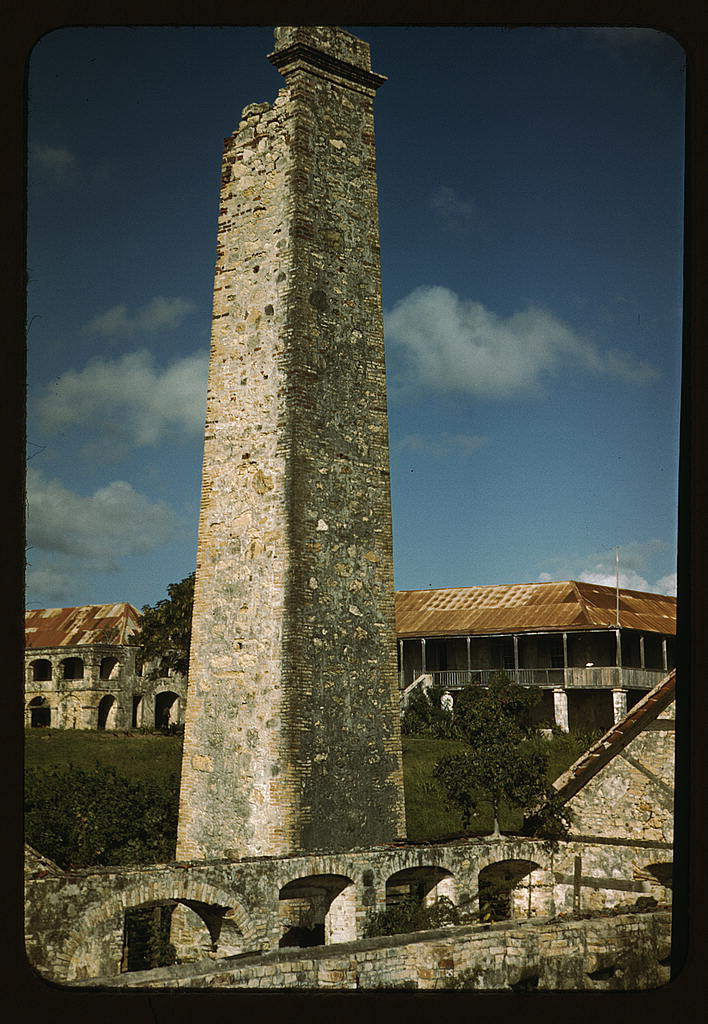
The plantation ruins in 1941

== See also ==
- National Register of Historic Places listings in the United States Virgin Islands
