= Listed buildings in Nordfyn Municipality =

This is a list of listed buildings in Nordfyn Municipality, Denmark.

== The list ==
=== 5400 Bogense ===
Listing name	Image	Location	Coordinates	Description
Adelgade 54, Bogense		Adelgade 54, 5400 Bogense		
Bogense Town Hall		Sct. Annagade 4, 5400 Bogense		
Bryggergården		Adelgade 44A, 5400 Bogense		
Gyldensteen		Burskovvej 2, 5400 Bogense		
Gyldensteen		Burskovvej 2, 5400 Bogense		
Gyldensteen		Burskovvej 2, 5400 Bogense		
Harritslevgård		Assensvej 1A, 5400 Bogense		
Harritslevgård		Assensvej 1A, 5400 Bogense		
Harritslevgård		Assensvej 1A, 5400 Bogense		
Harritslevgård		Assensvej 1A, 5400 Bogense		
Harritslevgård		Assensvej 1A, 5400 Bogense		
Jersoregård		Jersorevej 31, 5400 Bogense		
Jersoregård		Jersorevej 31, 5400 Bogense		
Jersoregård		Jersorevej 31, 5400 Bogense		
Jersoregård		Jersorevej 31, 5400 Bogense		
Jersoregård		Jersorevej 31, 5400 Bogense		
Jerstrupvej 44		Jerstrupvej 44, 5400 Bogense		
Landbohjemmet/Erik Menveds Kro		Østergade 2, 5400 Bogense		
Oregaard		Oregårdvej 23, 5400 Bogense		
Sandagergård		Kirkemosevej 2, 5400 Bogense		
Sandagergård		Kirkemosevej 2, 5400 Bogense		
Sandagergård		Kirkemosevej 2, 5400 Bogense		
Stegø Mølle		Stegøvej 98A, 5400 Bogense		

=== 5450 Otterup ===
Listing name	Image	Location	Coordinates	Description
Egebjerggård		Alleen 11, 5450 Otterup		
Egebjerggård		Alleen 11, 5450 Otterup		
Egebjerggård		Alleen 11, 5450 Otterup		
Hofmansgave		Hofmansgavevej 23, 5450 Otterup		
Hofmansgave		Hofmansgavevej 23, 5450 Otterup		
Hofmansgave		Hofmansgavevej 23, 5450 Otterup		The Norwegian House: Garden pavilion from 1814.
Hofmansgave		Hofmansgavevej 25, 5450 Otterup		
Hofmansgave		Hofmansgavevej 27, 5450 Otterup		
Kørup		Kørupvej 10, 5450 Otterup		
Kørup		Kørupvej 10, 5450 Otterup		
Otterup Hospital		Bakkevej 2B, 5450 Otterup		
Runddelhus		Tørresøvej 167A, 5450 Otterup		
Støbejernsmindestøtten		Kørupvej 0, 5450 Otterup		
Ørritslevgård		Strandvejen 151, 5450 Otterup		

=== 5462 Morud ===
Listing name	Image	Location	Coordinates	Description
Langesø		Langesøvej 146, 5462 Morud		
Røde Mølle, Savmølle ved Langesø		Blæsbjergvej 19, 5462 Morud		
Røde Mølle, Savmølle ved Langesø		Blæsbjergvej 19, 5462 Morud		
Tværskov Mølle		Tværskovvej 51, 5462 Morud		
Tværskov Mølle		Tværskovvej 51, 5462 Morud		
Østergade 19 og 19 C		Østergade 19A, 5400 Bogense		
Østergade 19 og 19 C		Østergade 19B, 5400 Bogense		

=== 5471 Søndersø ===
Listing name	Image	Location	Coordinates	Description
Dallund		Dallundvej 63, 5471 Søndersø		
Højagervej 32		Højagervej 32, 5471 Søndersø		
Højagervej 32		Højagervej 32, 5471 Søndersø		
Højagervej 32		Højagervej 32, 5471 Søndersø		
Højagervej 32		Højagervej 32, 5471 Søndersø		
Margård		Margårdsvej 10, 5471 Søndersø		
Særslev Præstegård		Kirkevej 4, 5471 Søndersø		
