= Johan Frederik Bardenfleth =

Danish naval officer, courtier and colonial administrator

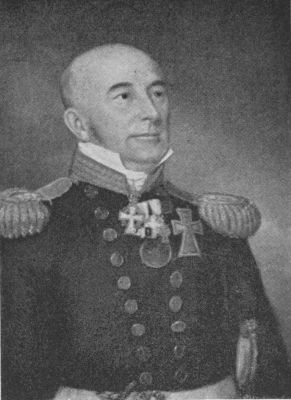
- Born: 19 August 1772; Holbæk, Denmark
- Died: 3 February 1833 (aged 60)
- Military career
- Allegiance: Denmark–Norway; Denmark
- Branch: (Denmark) Royal Dano-Norwegian Navy (Denmark) Royal Danish Navy
- Service years: 1781–1820s
- Rank: Counter-Admiral
- Unit: Charlotta Amalie
- Conflicts: French Revolutionary Wars; War of the Second Coalition; Battle of Copenhagen (1801)
- Awards: Grand Cross of the Order of the Dannebrog; Cross of Honour

Governor-General of the Danish West Indies
- In office 5 July 1822 – 14 July 1827
- Preceded by: Carl Adolph Rothe
- Succeeded by: Peter von Scholten

Counter-Admiral Johan Frederik Bardenfleth (19 August 1772 – 3 February 1833) was a Danish naval officer, courtier and colonial administrator who served as the Governor-General of the Danish West Indies from 1821 to 1827. The owner of Harridslevgaard on Funen, he was the father of prime minister Carl Emil Bardenfleth.

== Early life and background ==
Bardenfleth was born on 19 August 1772 in Holbæk, the son of Johan Frederik Bardenfleth (1740-1811) and Sophie Magdalene de Løvenørn (1741-1786). His father owned Harridslevgaard on Funen.

== Career ==
Bardenfleth became a cadet in 1781. In 1786, he was part of his uncle Poul de Løvenørn's expedition to Greenland in search of Østerbygden. He became a junior lieutenant in 1789 and a senior lieutenant in 1796. During the Battle of Copenhagen, he served as second-in-command of the defensive barge (defensionsprammen) Charlotta Amalie.

He was later sent to the Mediterranean Sea with the brig Sarpen (captain: C.C. Holck). In May 1797, he became a teacher at the Royal Danish Naval Academy. He was therefore decommissioned from the Sarpen at Malta and returned to Denmark on board the frigate Thetis. He therefore just missed in the Action of 16 May 1797.

In 1806, with rank of captain lieutenant, Bardenfleth was created kammerjunker and appointed as governor for Ferdinand, Hereditary Prince of Denmark. In 1810, now with rank of captain. he was appointed to chamberlain and hofchef for Prince Ferdinand.

On 20 February 1822, he was appointed as interin governor-general of the Danish West Indies. He remained in the office until 25 May 1826. He reached the rank of counter admiral in 1826. In 1829, he was appointed as ceremonimester at Ordenskapitlet.

== Personal life ==
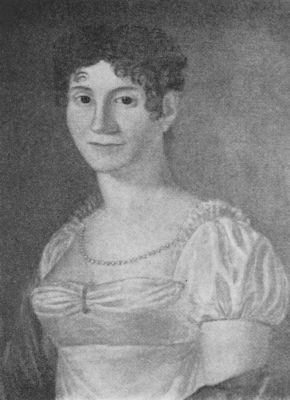
Augusta Wilhelmine von Hellfried-

Bardenfleth married on 16 April 1799 im Vejle to Augusta Wilhelmine Hellfried (16 November 1775 - 23 December 1861). She was the daughter of postmaster-general C.F. von Hellfried. They had the following children:

- Reinholdine Fredericke Wilhelmine Bardenfleth (1800-)
- Sophie Dorothea Bardenfleth (1801-1801)
- Sophie Dorothea Bardenfleth (1803-1826)
- Johan Frederik Bardenfleth (1805-1850)
- Carl Emil Bardenfleth (1808-1857) Gehejme-Statsminister
- Marie Sophie Frederikke Bardenfleth (1810-1887)

Bardenfleth succeeded his father as the owner of Harridslevgaard in 1810. In 1829, he sold it to Andreas Erich Heinrich Ernst lensgreve Bernstorff-Gyldensteen.

== Written works ==
- En militair Beskrivelse om Slaget paa Kjøbenhavns Red (1801)
- Om Orkaner (1831)

== Awards ==
- Knight of the Order of the Dannebrog (1808=
- Cross of Honour (1812)
- Commander of the Order of the Dannebrog (1918)
- Grand Cross of the Order of the Dannebrog (1826)
