= Janus August Garde =

His Excellency Janus August Garde
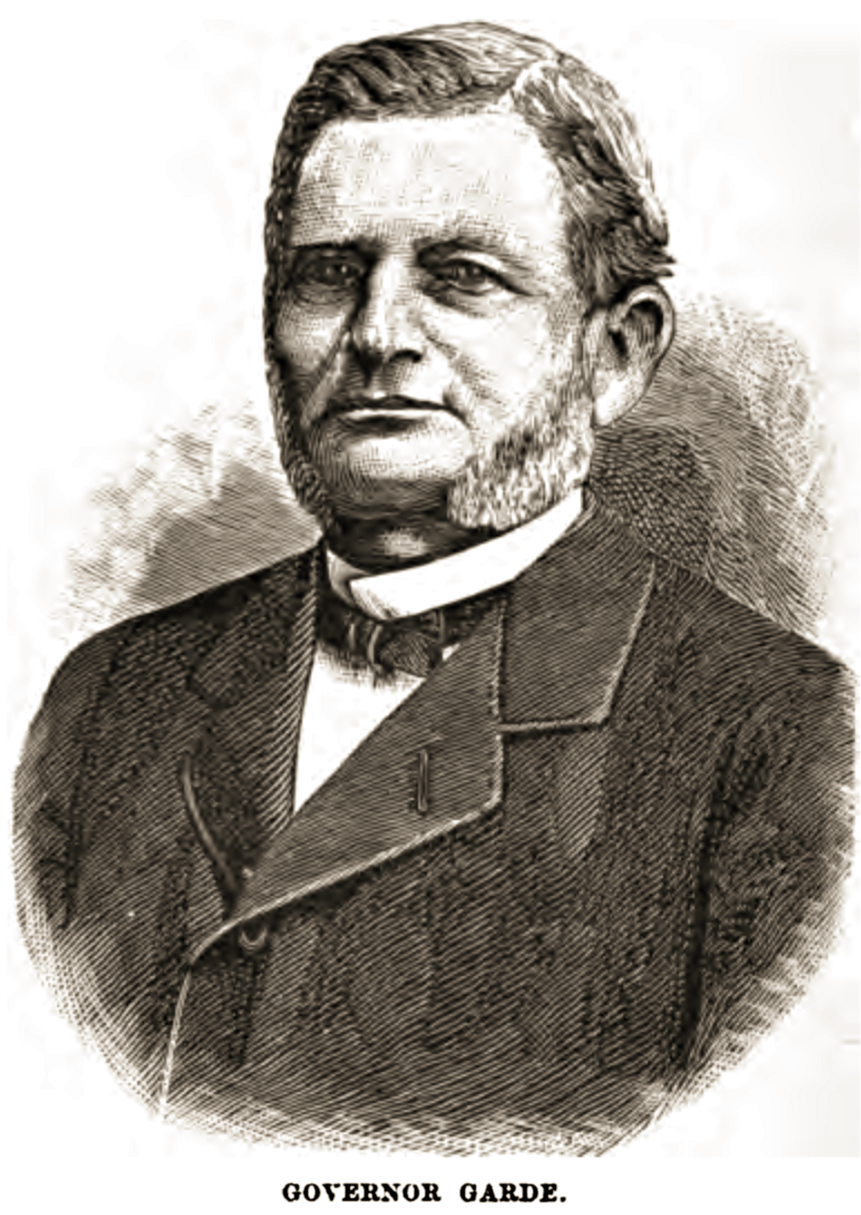

Governor of the Danish West Indies
- In office 25 September 1872 – 23 March 1881
- Preceded by: John Christmas (1799 - 1873)
- Succeeded by: Christian Henrik Arendrup (1837 - 1913)

Personal details
- Born: 12 December 1823
- Died: 23 May 1893 (aged 69) Copenhagen, Denmark
- Citizenship: Denmark

Janus August Garde (1823 – 1893) was Governor of the Danish West Indies from 25 September 1872 to 23 March 1881. He had a break in service from 5 January 1876 to 16 September 1876, when he went back to Denmark to gather knowledge on the latest of sugar processing. His absence was expected to be only few weeks, but lasted over eight months. Carl Anton Frederik Christian Hattensen (1828-1884) was acting Governor during Garde's absence.

Governor Garde is credited for establishing an education system on the islands, such the St. Thomas College in 1875, increasing the number of police and improving the appearance of the capital as well as the facilities of the harbor of St. Thomas.

The 1878 St. Croix labor riot, one of the most wide spread unrest of the 1800s on the Danish West Indies, were managed during his time as a governor as well.

Political offices
Preceded by John Christmas	Governor-General of the Danish West Indies; 1872–1881	Succeeded by Christian Henrik Arendrup
