= Frederik Oxholm =

Danish military officer, colonial administrator and planter

Frederik Thomas (von) Oxholm (4 April 1801 – 19 March 1871) was a Danish military officer, colonial administrator and planter. He served as Governor of St. Thomas and St. John from 1834 to 1836 and from 1848 to 1862 and briefly acted as Governor-General of the Danish West Indies after Peter von Scholten's departure in 1848.

== Early life and education ==
Oxholm was born on 4 March 1801 in the Danish West Indies to Peter Lotharius Oxholm and Ann O'Neill. He was the brother of Carl Arthur Oxholm, Oscar Oxholm and Waldemar Tully Oxholm. In around 1830, Oxholm bought the plantation Mountain on St. Croix. In 1831 and 1833, he also acquired the plantations Mint and 69 acres of Negrobay. From 1836, Frederik and Carl Oxholm leased the plantations Diamond & Ruby, St. George, Sally's Fancy and Hope, with a combined area of more than 750 acres. On 28 October 1832, he purchased the plantation Waidberggaard.

Oxholm was appointed as kammerjunker and a volunteer in the West Indian government. He was active in Christiansted's Civilian Artillery Corps, from 1836 as its leader with rank of captain. He was later appointed as ritmester.

== Colonial administrator ==
In 1833, Oxholm was appointed a vice stadshauptmand on St. Croix, 3rd Government Councillor and acting Governor of St, Thomas and St. Jan. On 24 January 1834, he was promoted to colonel. 1835 saw him promoted to 2nd Government Councillor. On 1 November 1836, his tenure as acting governor ended when Johannes Søbøtker was appointed to the post. He once again served as acting governor from Peter von Scholten's departure until Peder Hansen's arrival, from 8 July 1827 until 27 November 1848. On 1 December 1848, he was appointed as new governor of St. Thomas and St. John.

== Later life ==
On 8 October 1853, he retired from the post with the title of Major-General. He was created a Knight of the Great Cross in the Order of the Dannebrog and was also decorated with a number of French medals. He was also sent to Emperor Maximilian of Mexico with title of extraordinary envoy.

He never married. He died on 19 March 1871 and is buried at St. Thomas Cemetery.
