= Egebjerggård =

Manor house in Nordfyn Municipality, Denmark

- Interactive map of the Egebjerggård area

General information
- Architectural style: Neoclassical
- Location: Nordfyn Municipality, Denmark
- Coordinates: 55°36′4″N 10°20′52″E
- Construction started: 1802
- Renovated: 1731

Egebjerggaard, formerly known as Einsidelsborg, is a manor house and estate situated close to Otterup on the northern part of Funen, Denmark. For almost four hundred years, it belonged to members of the Podebusk (Putbus) family. It was incorporated as an independent manor in 1650. In 1810, it was included in the County of Roepstorff, The Neoclassical main building dates from 1831 and was most likely designed by Jørgen Hansen Koch. It was listed on the Danish registry of protected buildings and places in 1939. The estate covers 1,021 hectares of land.

== History ==
=== Podebusk family ===
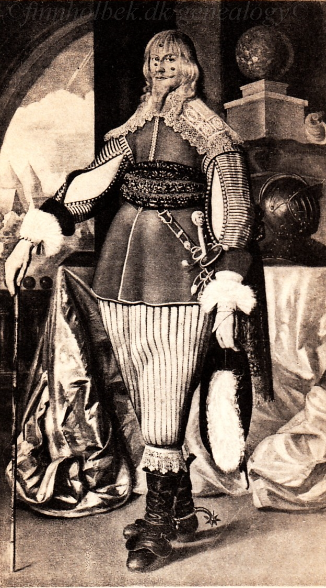
Henrik Podebusk

Egebjerggaard was originally operated as a farm under nearby Kørup. The estates were both owned by the noble Podebusk family from the early 15th century. In 1650, Egebjerggaard was incorporated as an independent manor. Henrik Podebusk had prior to that increased the size of the estate through the acquisition of more land. A new main building on the estate was constructed for him in 1651. The new manor was given the name Einsidelsborg after his wife Sidonia Maria Abrahamsdatter von Einsidel.

After Henrik Podebusk's death, Egebjerggaard and Kørup were divided between two of his sons. His son Mourids Podebusk took over Egebjerggaard, while his son Rudolf Abraham Podebusk took over Kørup. The two brothers' estates were both elevated to baronies in 1676. Their family name was at the same time changed from Podebusk to Putbus. The two baronies were united in 1716, when Mourids Putbus' son, Malte Putbus, inherited Kørup upon his uncle's death.

In 1702, Malte Putbus had also taken over the main possessions of the Putbus family on Rügen in Pomerania. In 1727, he was elevated to Reich Count by the German Emperor. During the 1700s, the Danish branch of the Putbus family became increasingly attached to Pomerania, as a consequence of the acquired possessions on Rügen. The last member of the Putbus family to own Einsidelsborg rarely stayed in Denmark. In their absence, Einsidelsborg fell into a state of neglect. In the end, he was therefore granted royal permission to sell his Danish holdings.

=== Moltke family ===
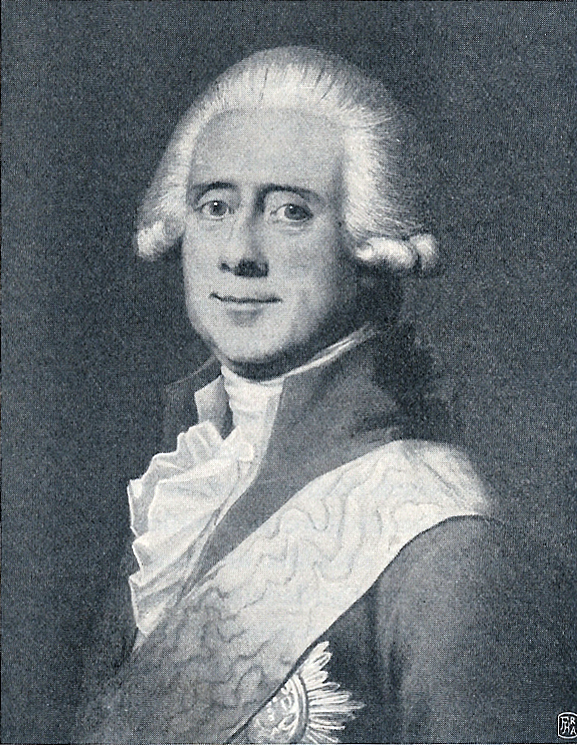
Joachim Godske Moltke.

In 1781, both baronies were bought by Joachim Godske Moltke, who was the son of one of the country's most powerful men, Court Marshal A. G. Moltke of Bregentved. Moltke concentrated and expanded the estate through transactions that involved abolishing the associated village community in favor of concentrating each farm's lands in one or a few locations. The changes were part of the agricultural reforms carried out in the second half of the 1700s. Moltke also introduced clover cultivation in the area, established a weaving industry and reclaimed the cove that separated Egebjerggård and Kørup.

=== Roepstorff and Petersdorff families ===
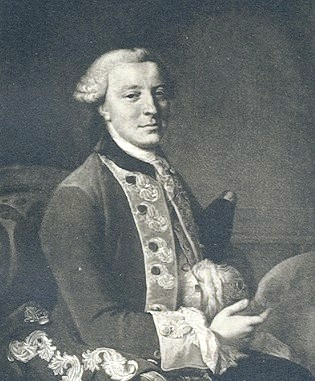
Ulrich Wilhelm de Roepstorff.

After Moltke took over Bregentved on his father's death in 1795, Egebjerggaard and Kørup were sold to Wilhelm de Roepstorff. Roepstorff, who had previously been Governor-General of the West Indies, now wanted to settle in Denmark.

In 1810, the two farms merged with the Sugar House in Odense in the county of Roepstorff, whose first possessor was Roepstorff's nephew, Christian Alexander von Petersdorff.

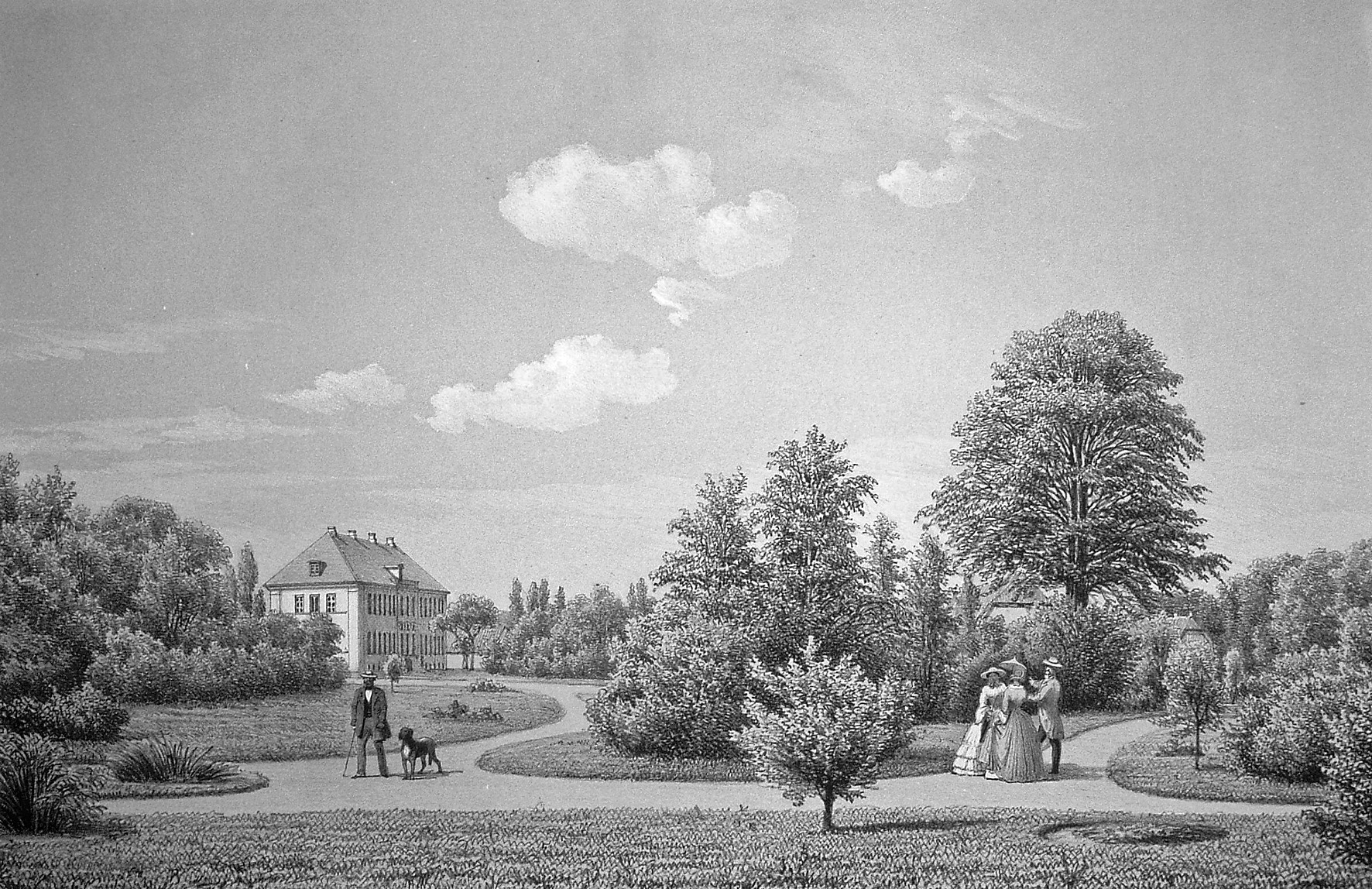
Einsidelsborg in 1860.

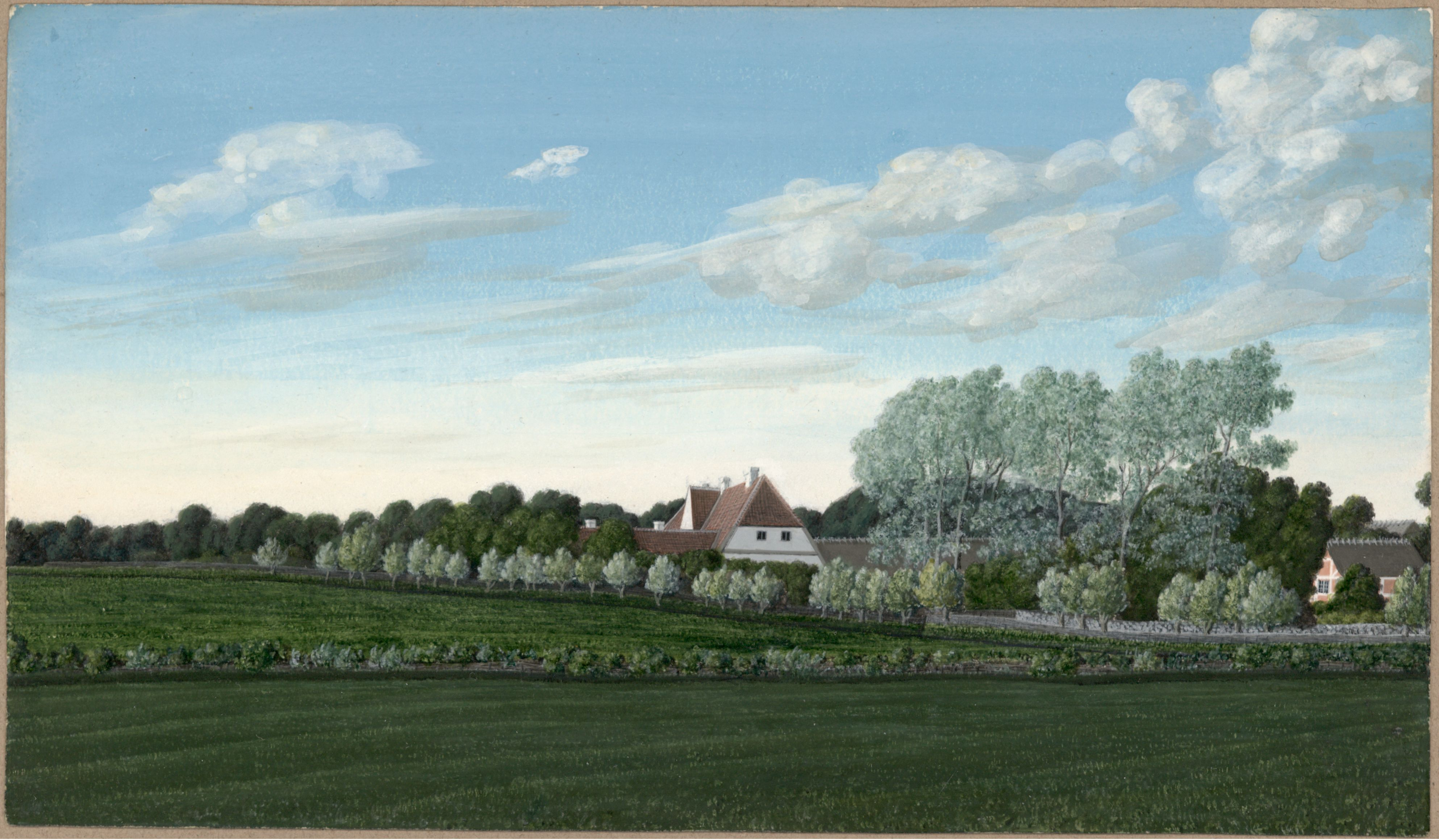
Einsidelsborg. Prospekt.

Upon Christian Alexander von Petersdorff's death in 1813, his son, Gregers Christian Frederik Petersdorff, took over the county and in 1831 built a new main building at Egebjerggaard. From 1839 the county was inherited by various members of the Petersdorff family, until in 1921 it passed to free property as a result of the so-called lensafløsningslov.

=== Later history ===
In 1929, Egebjerggaard was sold to Hans Christian Middelboe. The sale was the start of a period with many different owners, which only ended when Folketing member Mads E.g. Damgaard bought Egebjerggaard in 1963. Mads E.g. Damgaard was the owner of the farm until his death in 1999, after which Egebjerggaard was transferred to the limited liability company Egebjerggaard A/S by Mads E.g. Damgaards Familiefond.

== List of owners ==
- (1493-1541) Predbjørn Podebusk
- (1451-1593) Mourids Podebusk
- (1593-1616) Claus Podebusk
- (1616-1617) Sophie Nielsdatter Ulfstand
- (1617-1637) Henrik Podebusk og Mourids Podebusk
- (1637-1657) Henrik Podebusk
- (1657-1700) Mourids Putbus
- (1700-1750) Malte Putbus
- (1750-1764) Anselm Wilhelm Carl Putbus
- (1764-1781) Malte Frederik Mouridsen Putbus
- (1781-1795) Joachim Godske Moltke
- (1795-1810) Ulrich Wilhelm de Roepstorff
- (1810-1813) Christian Alexander Petersdorff
- (1813-1839) Gregers Christian Frederik Petersdorff
- (1839-1846) Ulrik Wilhelm von Petersdorff
- (1846-1915) Christian Alexander von Petersdorff
- (1915-1919) Paul Ludvig von Petersdorff
- (1919-1926) Theodor Sigismund Wedel-Heinen
- (1926-1929) Karen Middelboe, gift Wedel-Heinen
- (1929-1931) Hans Christian Middelboe
- (1931-1953) Søren Ebbe Ingemann
- (1953-1963) Christian Christensen
- (1963) Ejnar Oberbech-Clausen
- (1963-1999) Mads E.g. Damgaard
- (1999- )Egebjerggård A/S
