= Balthazar Frederik Mühlenfels =

Colonial Governor

Balthazar Frederik (von) Mühlenfels (died 5 September 1807) was a German-Danish colonial administrator and architect. He served as Governor of Saint Thomas and Saint John in the Danish West Indies from 1796 to 1800 and as Governor-General of the Danish West Indies from 1803 to 1807.

== Biography ==
Mühlenfels was born in Stetin. His year of birth is unknown. He was the son of dismissed infantry lieutenant Gustav Fridrich Mühlenfels. He became a cadet in 1766, a page in 1772 and was appointed the same year as junior lieutenant. In 1780, he became a senior lieutenant in the Falster Regiment on Foot. On 30 December 1785, on application, due to a "weak chest", he was dismissed with the rank of captain.

He then went to the Danish West Indies, where he was acting surveyor in 1786- In 1791, he was appointed as surveyor and building inspector on the islands. On 6 May 1795 he became deputy commander at Saint Thomas and Saint John with rank of lieutenant colonel. On 7 September 1796, he succeeded Thomas de Malville as commandant of the islands. In 1799 he advanced to deputy governor with rank of colonel. The government commission which was sent to the Danish West Indies on the surrender of the islands to the British in 1801 found him to have fully done his duty under the difficult circumstances, and at the same time as the commission was dissolved, on 27 October 1802, he was appointed to Governor-General with the rank of Major General.

In May 1807 he travelled with permission to Europe to recuperate in a colder climate, but already on 5 September he died in Heiligenhafen. In 1775 he had been naturalised as a Danish subject, but he could not provide any proof of his alleged background as foreign nobility.

Mühlenfels is generally described as "not a particularly significant governor-general". If he has nevertheless left significant traces in the Danish West Indies, it is due to his work as an architect. Arguably, he is one of the architects who created the classic Danish-West Indian building style that can still be seen on the islands today. He was very active in the rebuilding of Charlotta Amalia after the devastating fire of 1804.
