= Martin Purcell =

Lieutenant Governor of Placentia

Lieutenant Colonel Martin Purcell

Lieutenant Governor of Placentia
- In office 1717–1719
- Preceded by: John Moody
- Succeeded by: Samuel Gledhill

Martin Purcell was the Lieutenant Governor of Placentia from 1717-1719. He was appointed Governor as John Moody was called back to the Britain.

In 1719, Purcell was listed as having gone "AWOL".

Purcell would be replaced in 1719 by Samuel Gledhill.
