= Thomas de Malleville =

Danish army officer and colonial administrator

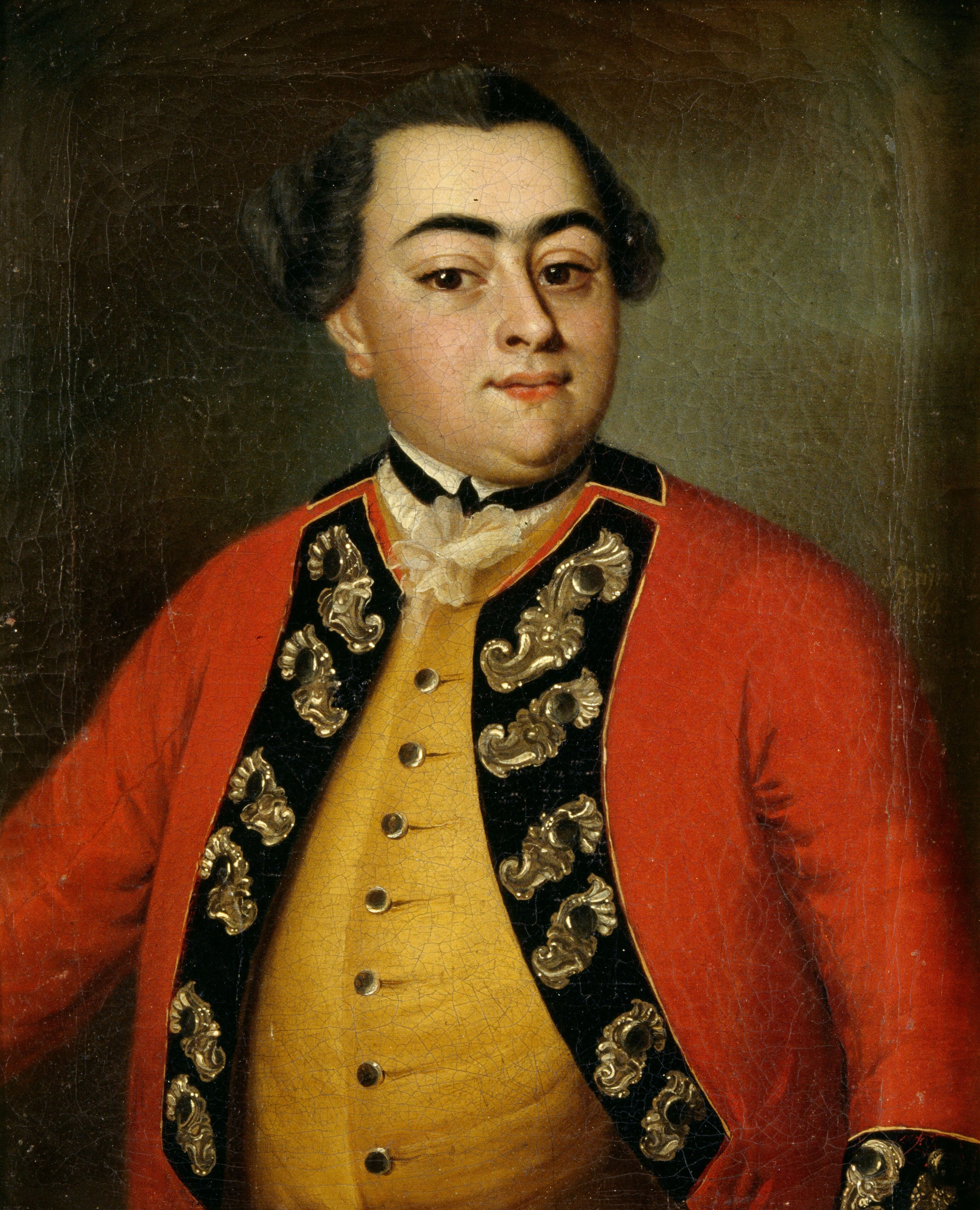
Portrait by Andreas Brünniche, 1762

Thomas de Malleville (1739 – 21 October 1798) was a Danish army officer and colonial administrator in the Danish West Indies. He was present at Johann Friedrich Struensee's arrest in January 1772. He served as Governor of St. Thomas and St. John from 1773 to 1795 and then as Governor-General of the Danish West Indies from 1796 until he died in 1798. He was the first and only governor of the islands of Creole descent.

== Early life ==
Malleville was born out of wedlock on St. Thomas to planter Jean de Malleville. His father was of Creole descent. His younger half-sister Elisabeth Sophie Charlotte de Malleville (1740–1768) married Hans Gustav Lillienskiold (1727–1786), owner of Lilliendal, Skuderupgaard and Høvdinghus.

== Career ==
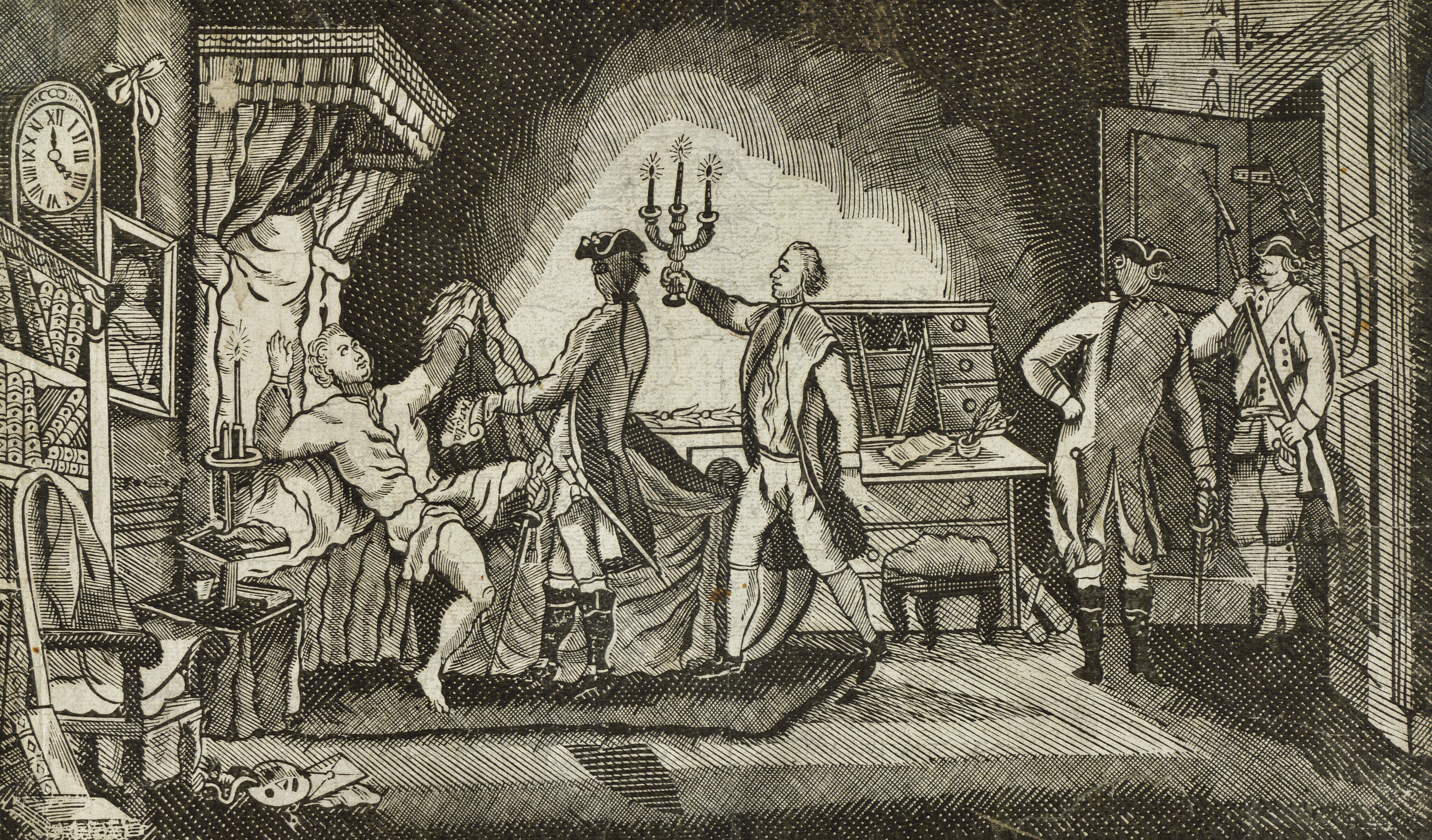
The arrest of Struensee. Malleville is seen with a Danish private by the door on the right hand side of the picture.

Malleville became a lieutenant in the Royal Danish Army in 1747. He joined the Holsteen Regiment on 29 April 1760, but on 24 September was transferred to the Falster Regiment with the rank of captain. In 1772, he was promoted to major. He was present the same year at the arrest of Johann Friedrich Struensee.

On 6 September 1773, he was appointed as Governor of St. Thomas and St. John. He left Copenhagen on board a ship in early November and arrived to St. Thomas on 22 December. On 25 July 1796, he was promoted to colonel. In 1796, he was appointed as Governor-General of the Danish West Indies with titular title of general. He died two years later.

== Personal life ==
Malleville married on 27 March 1763 to Johanne Marie Meyer (31 March 1750 – 20 November 1819), daughter of a naval captain. The couple had a son, Emmanuel, in 1764, who died at the age of five in 1769. The marriage was dissolved in 1780. Rumour had it, according to Charlotte Dorothea Biehl, that his wife had an affair with Frederik Carl Warnstedt. She was later married to Werner von der Schulenburg. She belonged to Queen Caroline Mathilda's inner circle.

Malleville was the first governor of the Danish West Indies who belonged to its Moravian congregation. He was also the first and only governor of the islands of Creole descent. He was a Freemason. He died on St. Thomas on 21 October 1798. He is buried at Friedensthals Cemetery.
