= Ulrich Wilhelm de Roepstorff =

Danish colonial administrator and landowner

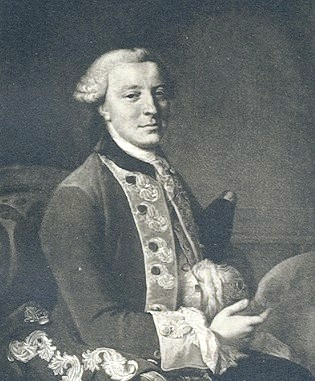
Ulrich Wilhelm de Roepstorff.

Ulrich Wilhelm de Roepstorff (12 July 1729 – 2 April 1821) was a Danish colonial administrator and landowner. He served as Governor-General of the Danish West Indies from 1772–73. He owned a couple of ships that sailed in the Danish West Indies Trade as well as a sugar refinery in Odense. In 1810, on the basis of his Funen estates, acquired after his return to Denmark, he was able to establish the County of Roepstorff. He was succeeded as Count of Roepstorff by his nephew Alexander von Petersdorff.

== Early life and education ==
Roepstorff was the son of major and later colonel lieutenant Christian Frederik de Roepstorff (1689–1741) and Christiane Marie de Röbern (1703–75). He was most likely born in Oldenburg.

== Career ==
Roepstorff became a volunteer cadet in 1741, a cadet in 1746 and a second lieutenant in 1753, In 1757, he was promoted to first lieutenant. In 1760 he was sent to the Danish West Indies but he was already sent back to Denmark the following year after a complaint from a superior officer. The case resulted in a warning. In 1763, he was promoted to captain lieutenant. In 1765, he was appointed as Governor of St. Thomas with rank of colonel lieutenant.

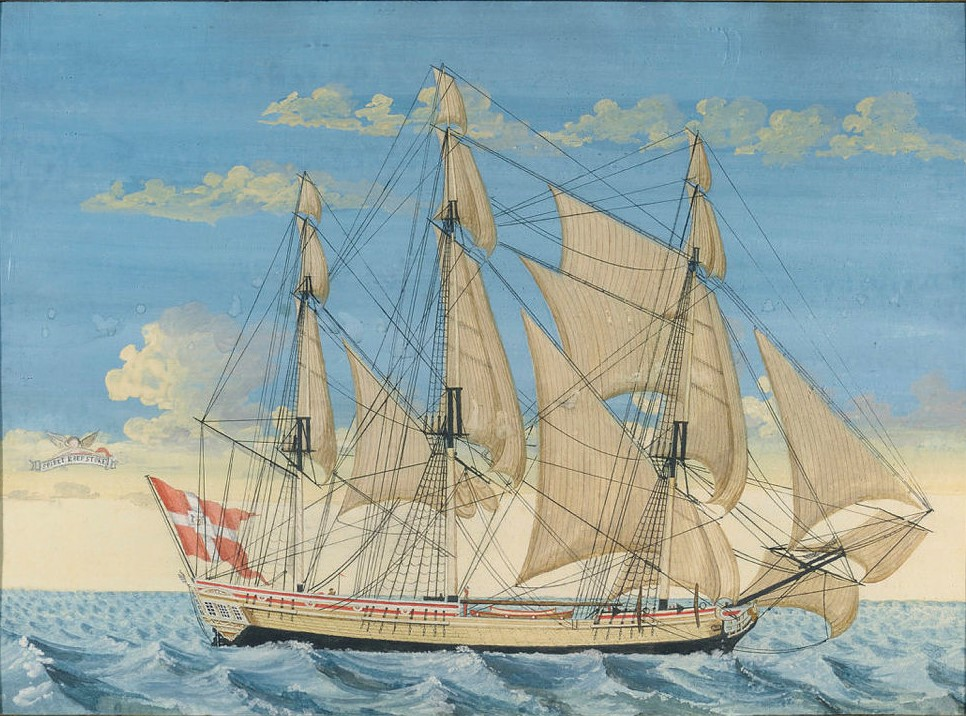
Roepstorff's ship Roepstorff painted in c. 1782. It was by then owned by Frédéric de Coninck and Niels Lunde Reiersen.

At Christian VII's ascent to the throne in 1766, governor-general Christian Lebrecht Prøck lost his support at court, and instead Peter Clausen was reappointed as governor-general, as the new king wanted a man who could more effectively collect the planters' debts to the state. The harsh manner in which Clausen tackled the planters resulted in disputes with other colonial administrators, including Roepstorff, with the outcome that Clausen complained to the General Customs Chamber (Generaltoldkammeret) about him. Clausen was subsequently recalled. In 1771, when Striense dismissed Claussen as part of the old regime, Roepstorff was installed as governor-general instead. However, the fall of Struensee also led to the dismissal of Roepstorff in 1773, and for the third time Clausen took over the office as governor-general.

== Later life and legacy ==
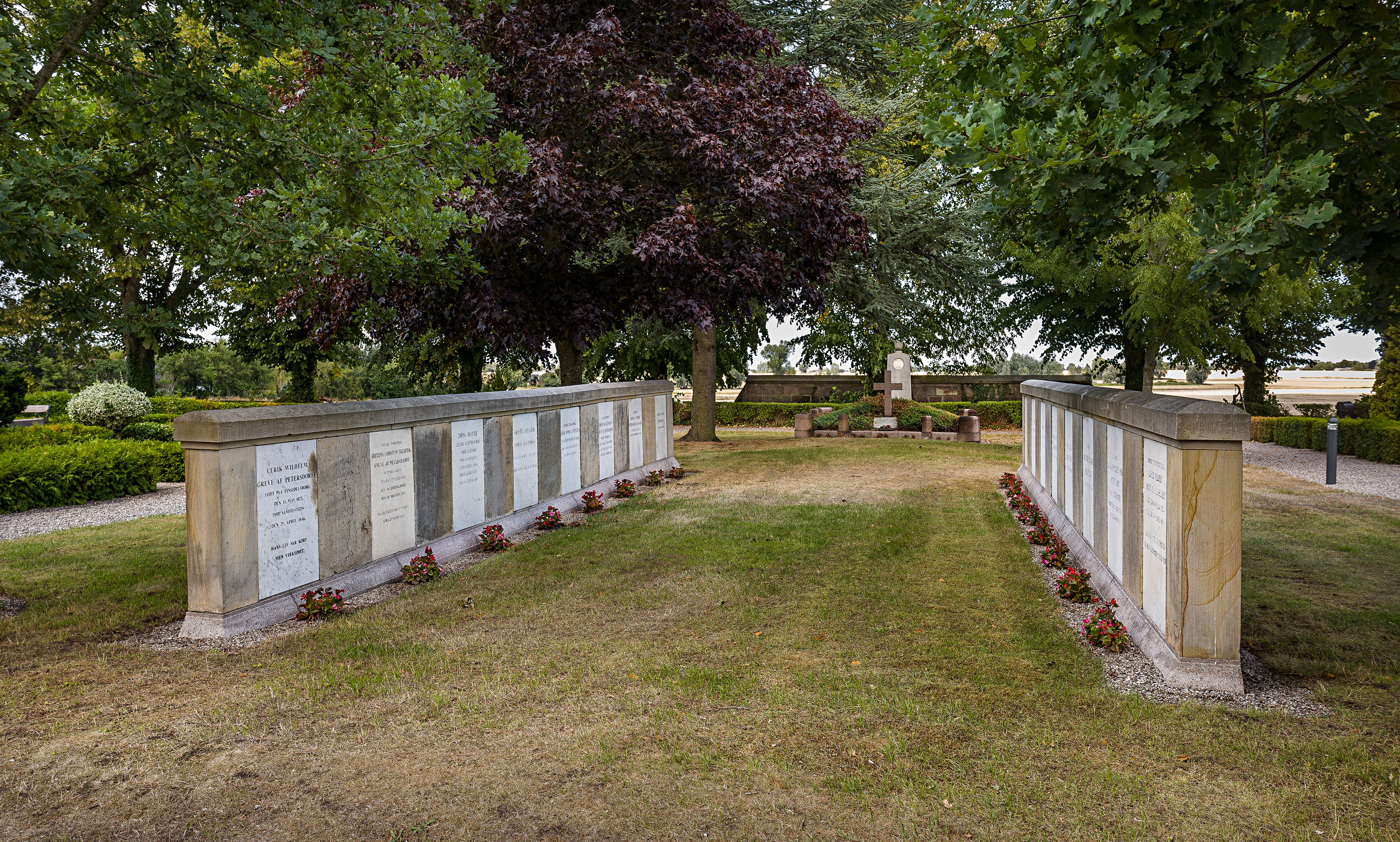
The Roepstorff family burial site.

After his return to Denmark, Roepstorff settled as a landowner on Funen. In 1783 he bought Østergård, which he owned until 1801. In 1795, he increased his holdings with the acquisition of the baronies of Korup and Einsidelsborg. In 1810, on the basis of these holdings, he was able to establish the County of Roepstorff. In the late 18th century, he was the owner of a couple of ships active in the West Indies trade. He also established a sugar refinery in Odense.

Roepstorff never married. He created two hospitals on his estates. He got the Royal Porcelain Manufactory to start production of a series of punch bowls with the Battle of Copenhagen as a motif.

He died on 2 April 1821 at Einsidelsborg (now Egebjerggård). He donated large sums to charity and created several endowments. He is buried in Krogsbølle Churchyard. His holdings passed to his nephew Alexander von Petersdorff.
