= Frederik Moth =

18th-century Danish colonial administrator

Frederik von Moth
- Governor of Danish West Indies
- Reign: 1724 – 1747
- Born: Copenhagen, Denmark
- Died: 12 August 1746 (aged 51–52); St. Thomas, Danish West Indies
- Buried: St. Thomas, Danish West Indies
- Family: Moth
- Spouse: Anna Elizabeth van Beverhoudt
- Issue: Poul (Paulus) Moth; Frederik Christian Moth; Christiane Amalie Moth; Margrethe Gertrud Elisabeth; Aletta Moth; Lucas Moth
- Father: Poul Moth
- Mother: Margrethe Poggenberg
- Occupation: Governor of the Danish West Indies

Frederik Christian Hals von Moth (1694 – 12 August 1746) was a Danish merchant, nobleman, colonial administrator and planter who served as Governor-General of St. Thomas and St. John in the Danish West Indies from April 1724 - May 1727 then again from 21 February 1736 - 13 April 1744. In addition, he served as Governor of St. Croix from 8 January 1735 - 15 May 1747. In 1736, his title was changed to Governor General (generalguvernør). His military rank was Commander (kommandørkaptajn). In addition, he held the rank of justitsråd (member of the supreme court).

== Family ==
Moth's father, Poul von Moth, was a knight. His great aunt was Sophie Amalie Moth Countess of Samsøe, a royal mistress of King Christian V of Denmark. Sophie Moth's son, Christian Gyldenløve became the founder of the Danneskiold-Samsøe family of high nobility.

== Life ==
Moth was born in Copenhagen but moved to St. Thomas where he started a family. He married Anna Elizabeth van Beverhoudt on 2 July 1722 on the island of St. Thomas. He had several children on the island over the following 17 years, one of whom was Margarethe Gjertrud who married Lucas Uytendale de Bretton in 1750. His son Frederik Christian Moth became governor of the Danish West Indies from 1770 to 1772

Moth founded the town of Christiansted in 1733 after Denmark-Norway purchased St Croix from the French. He designed the town using Christiania (now Oslo) as a model. Moth was named first Danish Governor of the Danish West India–Guinea Company on 12 November 1733. He also built the slave plantation known as Little Princess in Saint Croix, having acquired the land in 1738, along with owning the Frederiksdal slave plantation on Saint John.
