= Tethered Undersea Kites =

Underwater renewable energy technology

Tethered Undersea Kites (TUSKs) are underwater devices designed to harness energy from ocean currents. They consist of a kite-like structure tethered to the seabed, with onboard turbines that capture kinetic energy from water flows. TUSKs have garnered attention as a promising renewable energy technology for generating electricity in regions with predictable currents, such as tidal zones.

== Design and functionality ==
Tethered undersea kites operate by moving through ocean currents along controlled trajectories to maximize the relative velocity over their turbines. This motion enables them to capture more energy than stationary turbines of similar size. TUSKs are often designed with streamlined, wing-like bodies to enhance lift, and they use the principles of crosswind kiting—a technique originally applied in airborne wind energy systems—to increase energy output.

Key design components of TUSKs include:

- Kite or wing structure: Provides lift and helps maintain the TUSK’s path through water currents.
- Onboard turbines: Capture kinetic energy from the water as the TUSK moves along its path.
- Tether and control system: Anchors the TUSK to the seabed and controls its trajectory to optimize energy capture.

== Power generation mechanism ==
Tethered undersea kites are capable of generating power through dynamic cross-current movement. The power generated, P, depends on the lift-to-drag ratio of the kite and the speed of the current. In typical operation, a TUSK moves perpendicular to the ocean current, achieving a high apparent velocity over the turbine. The power generation potential of TUSKs often exceeds that of stationary underwater turbines due to this increased relative velocity.

=== Equation for power generation ===
The power generated by a TUSK can be expressed by the crosswind power equation:

$$P = C_L \cdot \frac{4}{27} \left(\frac{C_L}{C_D}\right)^2 S_w \cdot \frac{1}{2} \rho V_{\infty}^3$$

where:

- C_{L} is the lift coefficient of the kite,
- C_{D} is the drag coefficient,
- S_{w} is the wing planform area,
- ρ is the density of seawater, and
- V_{∞} is the free-stream velocity of the ocean current.

This formula highlights the dependence of power on the aerodynamic efficiency (lift-to-drag ratio) of the TUSK's wing.

== Applications ==
Tethered undersea kites are primarily aimed at renewable energy production in coastal and tidal zones where ocean currents are strong and consistent. Their potential applications include:

- Remote or offshore power generation: TUSKs can provide electricity in remote marine environments or offshore facilities.
- Supplementary energy for autonomous underwater vehicles (AUVs): Tethered kites could potentially extend the operational duration of AUVs by recharging their batteries during missions.

== Development and demonstrations ==
Several companies and research organizations are actively developing TUSKs, aiming to refine the technology and improve energy efficiency. For instance:

- Minesto’s TUSK Demonstrations: Minesto, a Swedish marine energy company, has conducted several successful tests of tethered undersea kites in locations such as the Holyhead Deep in Wales and Strangford Lough in Northern Ireland. These tests demonstrated that a TUSK with a 3-meter wingspan could generate up to 0.5 MW in a 0.8 m/s ocean current.

== Challenges and future prospects ==
While promising, tethered undersea kites face several technical and operational challenges, including:

- Structural durability: TUSKs operate in harsh underwater environments, requiring durable materials that can withstand prolonged exposure to ocean currents.
- Environmental impact: The impact on marine life and ecosystems is an area of ongoing study.
- Control systems: Maintaining a consistent and optimal trajectory is essential for energy efficiency, and advanced control systems are required for real-time adjustments.

Future research is focused on improving the materials, control systems, and scaling potential of TUSKs to make them a viable source of renewable energy on a larger scale.

== See also ==
- Ocean energy
- Renewable energy technologies
- Tidal stream generator

== Bibliography ==
- Minesto. (2021). "Minesto’s Deep Green technology." Available at Minesto’s official website.
- Loyd, M. L. (1980). "Crosswind kite power." Journal of Energy, 4(3), 106-111.
- Bracco, G., et al. (2011). "Wave energy converters for autonomous underwater vehicles." Ocean Engineering, 38(4), 1077-1085.
