= Sabella (company) =

Former French tidal stream turbine developer

Sabella SAS
- Industry: Renewable energy
- Founded: 2008; 18 years ago
- Defunct: January 24, 2024
- Headquarters: Quimper, France
- Products: Tidal stream turbines

Sabella SAS was a French company which developed and manufactured tidal stream turbines. It was categorized as a SME (small and medium-sized enterprise), founded in 2008 and based in Quimper, Brittany.

Sabella tested two turbines at sea. Firstly, the D03 in the Odet estuary between 2008 and 2009, which was the first tidal stream turbine connected to the French electricity grid. They then developed and tested the larger, commercial-scale, D10 turbine from 2015 onwards in the Fromveur Passage. As of October 2024, it remains operational, although operated by Inyanga Marine Energy Group.

The Sabella company was placed into receivership in October 2023, and liquidated on 19 January 2024 by the Commercial Court of Quimper.

== History ==
The original concept was conceived in 1999. In 2000 the company Hydrohélix Énergies was formed, and conducted numerous studies. The Sabella consortium was established in 2007 by the current shareholders. A year later, they founded the company Sabella SAS.

In 2008, Sabella launched the first French underwater tidal turbine, the Sabella D03, which was installed near Bénodet, at the mouth of the Odet Estuary. The experience gained and the results obtained with this project allowed the company to think about a full-scale pre-commercial turbine, the Sabella D10.

In 2009, Sabella responded to a call for "Marine Energy Demonstrators" from Agence de l'environnement et de la maîtrise de l'énergie (ADEME). Sabella won this in partnership with Ifremer, Veolia Environnement and Bureau Veritas, enabling the project to be partly financed by Investissements d'Avenir.

Between 2013 and 2014, the Sabella D10 was built then assembled in the Port of Brest in the first half of 2015. In June 2015, the turbine was immersed in the Passage du Fromveur, off the island of Ushant (Ouessant). After a year of testing, the turbine was recovered on 13 July 2016.

On 30 June 2014, Sabella finalised a €4.3 million fund raiser, with capital from two investment funds, Go Capital Amorçage and Emertec 5, as well as the CMI Group, the Société Geofinanciere and the Farinia Group. Since then, BPI France and General Electric have also invested in Sabella.

In 2016, BPI France invested €8 million.

In 2019, Sabella was one of the first set of companies in the Energy Transition Accelerator run by ADEME and BPI France.

In January 2021, Sabella acquired the technologies developed by General Electric as GE Renewable Energy, including by Rolls Royce, Alstom, and Tidal Generation Ltd (TGL).

In October 2023, the company was placed into receivership. Then in December, partner organisation Entech, also based in Quimper, acquired Sabella's assets and hired the 19 employees. However Entech did not acquire the D10 turbine, which was supplying about 75% of the power needs of Ushant. This turbine was later acquired and operated by the British company Inyanga Marine Energy Group.

In January 2024, the company was liquidated.

== The technology ==
Sabella's technology is based on the principles of technological simplicity and robustness, giving it greater reliability and lower maintenance requirements than more sophisticated solutions.

The main characteristics are as follows:

- Symmetrical blades, which allow the turbine to capture both the ebb and flood tide without having to rotate through 180 degrees.
- Modular architecture: the Sabella turbine is composed of two parts, with a heavy gravity base placed on the seabed ensuring stability of the turbine against the water current. The turbine is mounted on top of this, and is much lighter, which allows it to be easily replaced for maintenance.
- Generator with direct drive and permanent magnets, to avoid any complex mechanical element subject to additional failure and to more regular maintenance.
- Turbine placed on the seabed, which allows it to be invisible from the surface, not to interfere with navigation, and be less exposed to hydrodynamic loads linked to the wave swell in intermediate water depths. The D10 turbine was mounted on a tubular steel tripod foundation approximately 23 m wide, with the turbine 12.5 m above the seabed.

== Sabella D03 ==
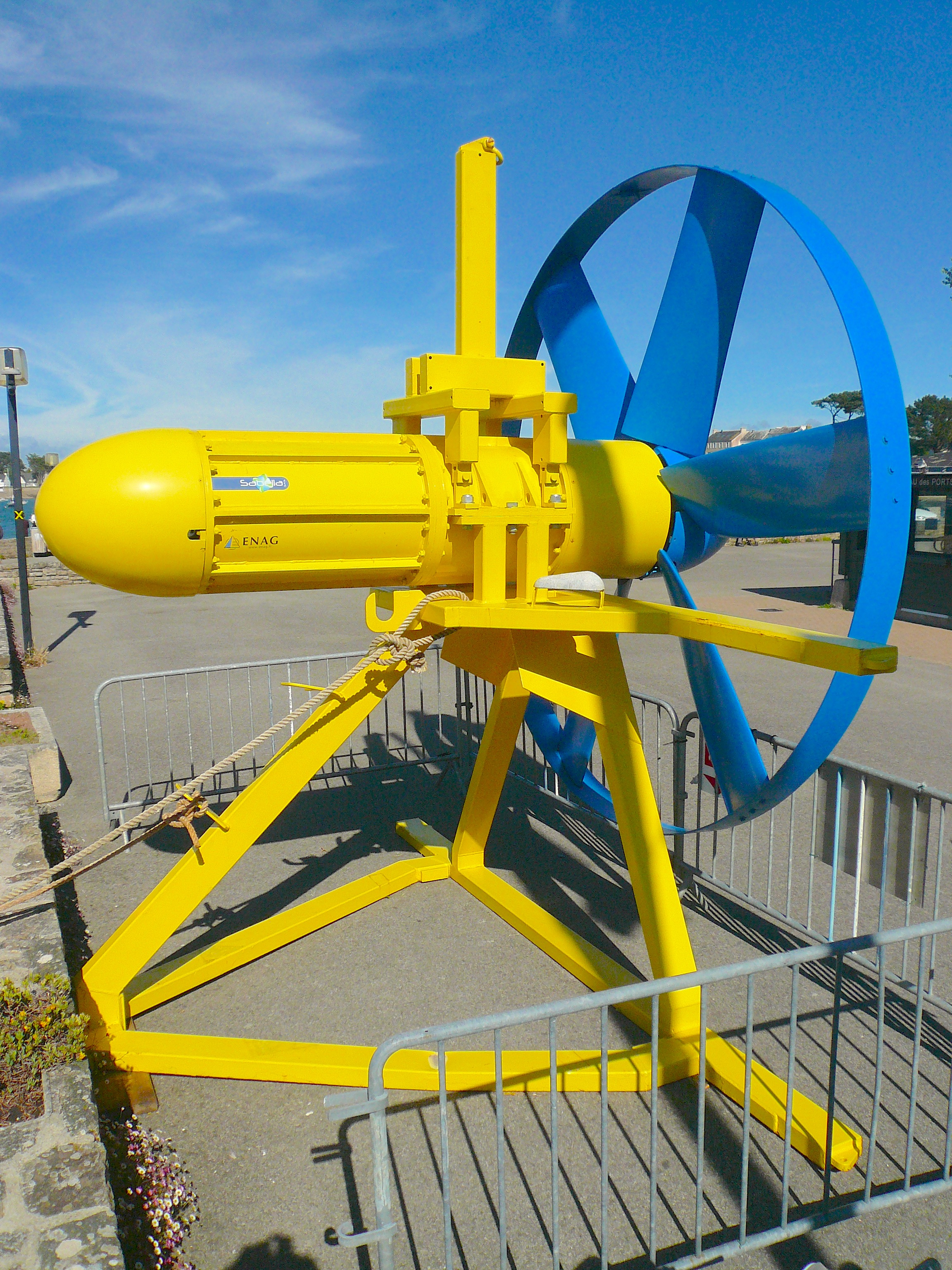
Sabella D03 turbine, with 3m rotor

The Sabella D03 was an experimental project led by the Sabella consortium with the support of local public bodies and ADEME, and with technical support from Ifremer. It consisted of designing, constructing, and testing a 1/3-scale prototype tidal turbine. It was submerged off the coast of Bénodet, in the Odet Estuary, in April 2008 for a period of one year. The rotor had a diameter of 3 metres (10 ft), and was rated at 10 kW power. Numerous tests and measurements were carried out, including demonstrating its safety towards fish and its low noise .

This tidal turbine is now on the forecourt of Oceanopolis in Brest, as an educational object.

== Sabella D10 demonstrator ==
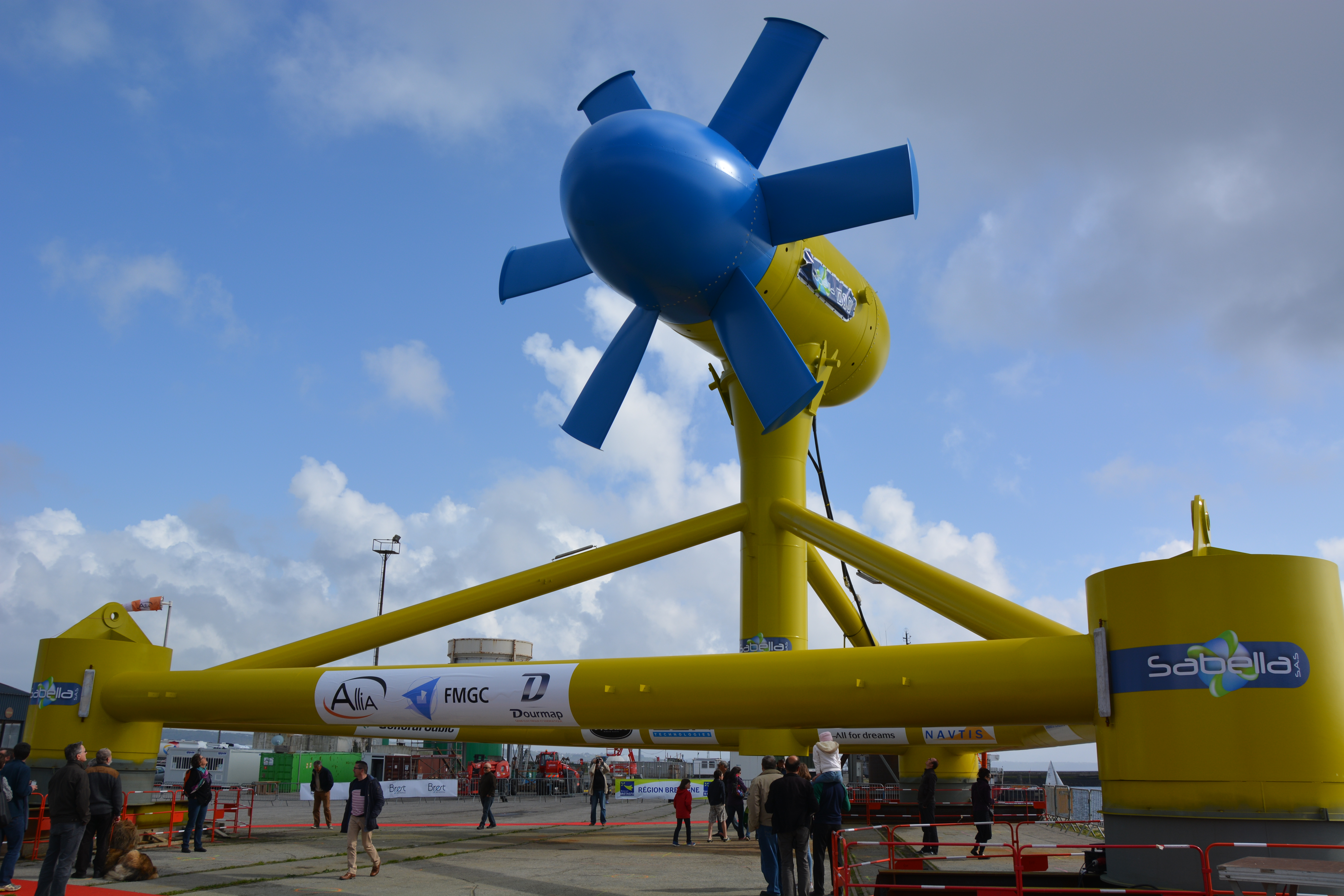
The Sabella D10 in the port of Brest in April 2015 before being submerged in the sea

The Sabella D10 demonstrator project was supported by ADEME via Investissements d’Avenir. This led to the development of a commercial scale turbine, with a diameter of 10 metres (33 ft) and a power output of 1 MW. Construction of the turbine started in June 2012. The blades are carbon fibre and were constructed by CDK Technologies, a shipyard for offshore racing boats based in Port-la-Forêt in Finistère.

The turbine was installed on 25 June 2015 in the Passage du Fromveur, between the island of Ushant and the Molène archipelago, at a depth of 55 metres (180 ft). The tidal currents in this straight can reach 7 to 9 knots (13 to 17 km/h; 8 to 10 mph). It was connected to the Enedis de Ouessant power grid on 5 November 2015 at 23:00, making it the first grid-connected tidal stream turbine in France. It remained in place for a year of testing. This included extensive monitoring and instrumentation to have feedback on production, performance, resistance, environmental impact, social acceptance, etc.

The project partners included Veolia Environnement for the life-cycle analysis of the turbine, Ifremer for underwater acoustics and the ageing of materials in the marine environment, and Bureau Veritas for the validation of the mechanical and manufacturing studies with an objective of future certification. The Iroise Marine Natural Park studied the impacts of the turbine within its boundary. The cost of the project was estimated to be around 13–14 million euro in 2015.

In October 2015, hackers attacked the satellite communication system for the D10 turbine, blocking electricity generation for 15 days. They encrypted access to communications and demanded a ransom of 4,000 dollars for the decryption key, although they were not successful; the terminal was changed and additional security measures installed.

The subsea cables and connections for the project were developed by MacArtney.

After being submerged in 2015–2016, the Sabella D10 turbine was recovered in order to improve the system and for maintenance. In October 2018, the turbine was submerged back to the same place (between Molène and Ouessant) and continued operating until April 2019. In April 2022, the D10 water turbine is again immersed for a third test run.

In September 2023, it was reported the turbine was supplying around 25% of the electricity used on Ushant Island.

The project was taken over by the British company Inyanga Marine Energy Group in October 2024. The Falmouth-based company secured permission to operate the D10 turbine until August 2028.

=== Environmental and societal impact ===
Due to the very low speed of rotation of its blades (10 to 15 revolutions per minute), the turbine presents little danger to underwater fauna and flora. In addition, the acoustic emission of Sabella D03 was measured during the year it was submerged in the Odet. The impact on underwater fauna (fish, marine mammals and crustaceans) has been shown to be very low. These results should be considered with caution, as the signature varies from one machine to another and the acoustic emergence on a site is related to the background noise of the site (the higher the current, the stronger the background noise is). The Iroise Marine Natural Park also hoped that the behaviour of seals in the vicinity of the water be studied. Finally, as the Sabella water turbine is placed on the seabed on a gravity foundation, no drilling is therefore carried out in the soil.

In January 2013, an official of the group of environmentalists and independents of Ushant called for the "faster" establishment of tidal turbines, to secure the island's power supply.

== Partnerships ==
In June 2012, Sabella signed a partnership agreement with Eole Génération, a subsidiary of GDF Suez that has since become ENGIE Futures Energies. This partnership between the energy company and the turbine developer aims both to enhance the energy of the Fromveur site, and pre-qualify the technology for future commercial exploitation of the currents on this site.

Since 2016, Akuo has partnered with Sabella to build a water turbine farm off the coast of Breton.

Sabella negotiated a contract for six tidal turbines with a Filipino developer, and hopes to reduce the cost of its machines from 7 down to 4 million euro.

In June 2021, Sabella signed a partnership agreement with the Scottish company Nova Innovation to develop tidal projects in France and the United Kingdom. Sabella then announced in January 2022 joint plans with Nova Innovation to each develop 6 MW of a 12 MW berth at Morlais.

== Future plans ==
=== Eussabella project ===
A pilot farm project in the Passage du Fromveur was proposed by Sabella, called "Eussabella", from a contraction of the Breton language name for Ushant, Eussa, and Sabella. This was to consist of four D12 machines and it would supply the island of Ushant, which is not connected to the continental network. The turbines would be combined with an energy storage system and other forms of renewable energy, ensuring the continuity of electricity supply during periods of lower current.

A call for expressions of interest was published by ADEME on 1 October 2013 for the installation of such pilot farms in the Fromveur and Raz Blanchard. Sabella submitted a proposal in partnership with ENGIE for the installation of a pilot farm at Fromveur. As this was not selected, Sabella again applied for an island energy project with the French energy company AKUO.

In the longer term, Sabella hoped to develop commercial tidal farms, specifically at Fromveur, but also elsewhere in France, Europe and the world.

== Other technologies ==
In addition to tidal stream turbines Sabella developed other concepts, including river turbines. The Canadian subsidiary Sabella Energy Inc. developed the Sabella River SR-01, and in 2011 expected to test it in the St. Lawrence River, Montreal in summer 2012.

A floating subsurface turbines concept was also being studies, under the name Sequana.
