= Tethys (database) =

Tethys is an online knowledge management system that provides the marine renewable energy (MRE) and wind energy communities with access to information and scientific literature on the environmental effects of devices. Named after the Greek titaness of the sea, the goal of the Tethys database is to promote environmental stewardship and the advancement of the wind and marine renewable energy communities. The website has been developed by the Pacific Northwest National Laboratory (PNNL) in support of the U.S. Department of Energy (DOE) Water Power Technologies Office and Wind Energy Technologies Office. Tethys hosts information and activities associated with two international collaborations known as OES-Environmental and WREN, formed to examine the environmental effects of marine renewable energy projects and wind energy projects, respectively.

== Content overview ==
As industry, academia, and government seek to develop new renewable energy sources from moving water and wind, there exists an opportunity to gather potential environmental effects of these technologies. Tethys aims to evaluate and measure these effects to ensure that aquatic and avian animals, habitats, and ecosystem functions are not adversely affected, nor that important ocean and land uses are displaced. While these studies are presently scattered among different organizations, Tethys creates a centralized hub where this information can be found. Each document is labeled with an environmental stressor and receptor which categorize the type of potential harm and the affected area of the environment. The categories and the technology types covered are listed below:

Stressors	Receptors	Technology Type
Attraction; Avoidance; Changes in Flow; Collision; Displacement; Electromagnetic Fields; Entrapment; Habitat Change; Lighting; Noise	Bats; Birds; Ground-Nesting Birds; Passerines; Raptors; Seabirds; Shorebirds; Waterfowl; Ecosystem Processes; Fish; Demersal Fish; Pelagic Fish; Invertebrates; Marine Mammals; Cetaceans; Pinnipeds; Physical Environment; Sediment Transport; Water Quality; Reptiles; Terrestrial Mammals; Human Dimensions; Climate-change; Environmental Impact Assessment; Fisheries; Legal and Policy; Life Cycle Assessment; Marine Spatial Planning; Navigation; Recreation and Tourism; Stakeholder Engagement; Visual Impacts	Marine Energy general; Ocean Current; Ocean Thermal Energy Conversion; Riverine; Salinity Gradient; Tidal; Wave; Wind Energy general; Land-Based Wind; Offshore Wind

== OES-Environmental ==
OES-Environmental, formerly known as Annex IV, is a collaborative project among member nations of the International Energy Agency (IEA) Ocean Energy Systems (OES) to examine environmental effects of ocean energy projects and research. There is currently a wide range of ocean energy technologies and devices in development around the world; the few data that exist on environmental effects of these technologies are dispersed among different countries and developers. While the US Department of Energy is the operating agent, currently (as of September 2024) 16 out of 23 nations from OES are involved: Australia, Canada, China, Denmark, France, India, Ireland, Japan, Mexico, Monaco, Portugal, Singapore, Spain, Sweden, the United Kingdom, and the United States. There have been four phases of this initiative:

=== Phase 1: 2010-2013 ===
Phase 1 Annex IV (2010-2013) brought together seven Ocean Energy Systems (OES) nations, led by the US, to establish a smart, searchable, public, online knowledge base that features information on environmental effects of marine renewable energy (MRE). Annex IV also engaged numerous academic, scientific, and commercial organizations and institutions through gathering of information for Tethys and engagement in webinars and other online activities, and facilitated sharing of research findings through workshops and online meetings. The culmination of phase 1 was a report, Environmental Effects of Marine Energy Development around the World: Annex IV Final Report, that summarized the state of understanding of environmental effects around wave and tidal devices, focused on three case studies:

1. The Interaction of Marine Animals with Turbine Blades
2. Effects of Acoustic Output from Tidal and Wave Devices on Marine Animals
3. The Environmental Effects of Marine Energy Development on Physical Systems

Annex IV also began to collect metadata on project sites that were performing environmental baseline studies and/or monitoring studies and relevant research studies that were underway. Over 150 forms were collected, providing details on nearly every project that has been deployed to date and on the most current research being conducted. All of this metadata is hosted in Tethys along with associated reports and publications.

=== Phase 2: 2013-2016 ===
During phase 2 (2013-2016), Annex IV brought together 13 nations, again led by the US. This three-year period continued to expand the collection of scientific papers, reports, and metadata on MRE development in relation to environmental effects. Phase 2 also placed a strong emphasis on bringing together the community interested in environmental effects, which includes researchers, developers, regulators, and stakeholders. This was achieved through quarterly webinars on topics of interest delivered by experts in the field; online expert forums that allowed small groups of researchers to discuss and collaborate on technical topics that continue to complicate monitoring of effects; and workshops, conference support and participation that brought additional focus to environmental topics of mutual concern. Key activities during this phase included a partnership with the European Wave and Tidal Energy Conference (EWTEC 2015) in Nantes, France during September 2015, that brought enhanced focus and researcher participation on environmental issues to this well-regarded conference. Additionally, the preparation of the Annex IV 2016 State of the Science Report: Environmental Effects of Marine Renewable Energy Development Around the World synthesized the knowledge of environmental researchers and information sources to assess progress that has been made and questions that remain to be answered about environmental impacts of MRE devices. A draft of the State of the Science report was made available for OES Executive Committee members and selected peer reviewers in November 2015, and was released for public review during the International Conference on Ocean Energy (ICOE) in Edinburgh UK in February 2016. The final State of the Science report was released in April 2016 in Washington DC., along with a number of derivative products aimed at getting the essential information of the report to varied audiences who might not consider reading the full report.

=== Phase 3: 2016-2020 ===
During phase 3 (2016-2020), Annex IV continued to pursue efforts to identify and bring clarity to the importance of key MRE device interactions with the marine environment. Following release of the 2016 State of the Science report, the Annex IV community put considerable effort into ensuring that the report itself and its key findings were made accessible and easily discovered. Many webinars, conference presentations (including EWTEC 2017, Asian Wave and Tidal Energy Conference (AWTEC) 2018, Australian Ocean Renewable Energy Symposium 2018, Environmental Interactions with Marine Renewables (EIMR) 2018, and Marine Energy Technology Symposium 2018), and other outreach opportunities helped spread the messages of the report and the Annex IV/OES role in furthering understanding of environmental effects to facilitate consenting.

Other activities carried out by Annex IV during phase 3 included two workshops on collision risk to marine mammals, seabirds, and fish from tidal stream and river turbines, and two workshops on the gathering and use of social and economic data needed for consenting processes. Ongoing work to collect, curate, and make accessible existing information on MRE environmental effects on Tethys has expanded the platform and reached ever growing audiences. The phase culminated in the release of the 2020 State of the Science report, which reflects the most current and pertinent published information about interactions of marine renewable energy devices and associated infrastructure with the animals and habitats that make up the marine environment. During this phase, Annex IV was also renamed to OES-Environmental.

=== Phase 4: 2020-2024 ===
OES-Environmental has been approved for another 4-year extension consisting of three interrelated tracks: (1) information gathering and analysis, (2) information dissemination, and (3) engaging the community to support research and monitoring needs. This phase will continue most ongoing activities, while expanding to engage the regulatory community and address socio-economic issues.

== WREN ==
WREN (Working Together to Resolve Environmental Effects of Wind Energy), also known as Task 34, was established by the IEA Wind Committee to address environmental issues associated with commercial development of land-based and offshore wind energy projects. While the U.S. DOE's National Renewable Energy Laboratory (NREL) is the operating agent, currently (as of October 2020) 13 out of 26 nations involved in IEA Wind are involved: Belgium, Canada, France, Ireland, Italy, Netherlands, Norway, Portugal, Spain, Sweden, Switzerland, the United Kingdom, and the United States. There has been three phases of this initiative:

=== Phase 1: 2012-2016 ===
The goal of WREN is to facilitate international collaboration that advances global understanding of environmental effects of offshore and land-based wind energy development, though the formation of a community of practice around research, monitoring and management of the environmental effects of wind energy development. Two key products were developed during phase 1: 1) Tethys was expanded to include land-based wind and host WREN activities and 2) a white paper focused on adaptive management.

=== Phase 2: 2016-2020 ===
The second phase of WREN included the expansion of Tethys, development of several white papers, continuation of the webinar series, and outreach and engagement efforts. All these activities were aimed at contributing to supporting the expansion of land-based and offshore wind energy deployment.

=== Phase 3: 2020-2024 ===
The objective for the third phase of WREN is to assess the global state of the science related to the environmental effects of both offshore and land-based wind energy development. Over the course of the third phase, WREN will: (1) Identify priority international needs for further research related to the environmental effects of wind energy development; (2) Aggregate, synthesize, and disseminate information on the global state of the science on high-priority issues and recommended practices within the wind energy industry; and (3) Assess the technical readiness and effectiveness of solutions and explore the feasibility of transferring technologies and methodologies among jurisdictions.

== Features ==
Additional functionality is regularly added to Tethys in response to peer reviews, surveys, and general comments from users. However, there are primary functions of Tethys that allow users to experience community, search through the data, and learn more about the new and exciting field of renewable energy.

=== Knowledge Base ===
The Knowledge Base is primarily displayed as a table view that utilizes the alphabetical column sorting, facet box selection, and keyword search to allow users to easily sift through the information. Over 5300 media entries relevant to the environmental effects of wind energy and marine renewable energy are available, consisting of journal articles, reports, websites, conference papers, presentations, workshop articles, theses, books, book sections, videos, datasets, magazine articles, project site information, and research study information. This is a growing database, where relevant materials that are newly published or discovered will be added.

=== Map Viewer ===
The interactive Map Viewer shows the locations of geo-tagged project sites, research studies, and documents gathered from across the world. More than 3200 items appear on the map, a subset of the information available in the Knowledge Base. Users may interact with the map with zooming and panning functions, facet box selection, and a keyword search. Selecting one of the icons will reveal a specific page with more in-depth information. This is a growing database, where relevant materials that are newly published or discovered will be added.

=== Connections ===
In an effort to connect members of this growing community, Tethys is meant to act as a hub, providing resources and contacts for those looking for more information. One way is by providing links to similar databases that may have different approaches to viewing data, or that may provide a different focus on the data collected. Another page lists summaries of the regulatory frameworks in many of the major countries, providing links to agencies and laws rather than going into detail. There is also an extensive database of over 1700 organizations involved in wind energy and marine renewable energy and the environment, providing a list of publications affiliated with the organization and some basic information. Members of the Tethys community that have created a free account also have the ability to share their contact information and interests to with other community members in a searchable table.

=== Broadcasts ===
Tethys also houses multimedia in the broadcast tab, meant to engage users in the Tethys community. Everything is freely available to the public and easily searchable.

- Tethys Blasts - a bi-weekly newsletter highlighting new information and events available on Tethys, as well as recent news in renewable energy.
- Environmental Webinars - webinars on environmental effects of marine or wind energy, hosted by US DOE, OES-Environmental, WREN, and other organizations.
- Conferences and Workshops - presentations, reports, and video from conferences and workshops on environmental effects of marine or wind energy.
- Expert Forums - online discussions among invited scientific and engineering experts on focused research topics of concern to marine energy development.
- Tethys Stories - brief descriptions of programs, organizations, or topics of interest in wind and marine renewable energy.

== Technical overview ==
Tethys began in 2011 hosted on a Semantic MediaWiki platform, but migrated to Drupal in early 2013. Drawing on many years of experience and systems development, developers have tailored the website to allow for semantic searches and the organization of data through tagging individual files, documents, and multimedia products. Content is regularly monitored and curated, though suggestions from the user community are always welcome.

== Community of Knowledge Hubs ==
In 2019, a partner database called Tethys Engineering was created to address the technical and engineering aspects of marine renewable energy. Tethys Engineering mirrors the design and functionality of Tethys, building off nearly a decade of database management. The two websites have federated search capabilities and share some content indices.

An effort was also initiated in 2019 by the U.S. Department of Energy Water Power Technologies Office to enhance access to marine renewable energy information and reduce duplication of efforts. This resulted in the PRIMRE (Portal and Repository for Information on Marine Renewable Energy) system, which created a single point of access for databases such as Tethys, Tethys Engineering, the MHK Data Repository, the MRE Technologies Database, and Telesto.

== See also ==
- Marine energy
- Tidal power
- Marine current power
- Wave power
- Ocean thermal energy conversion
- Osmotic power
- Alternative energy
- Environmental effects of wind power
- Pacific Northwest National Laboratory
