= Fromveur Passage =

Coordinates: 48.43757°N 5.04118°W

Map of the Iroise Sea

The Fromveur Passage (French: Passage du Fromveur; Breton: Strizh-mor ar Froñveur), sometimes called St. Vincent's Channel, is a strait that lies between the island of Ushant and Kéréon lighthouse on Men Tensel Rock, off the coast of the French province of Brittany. It forms part of the northern limit of the Iroise Sea.

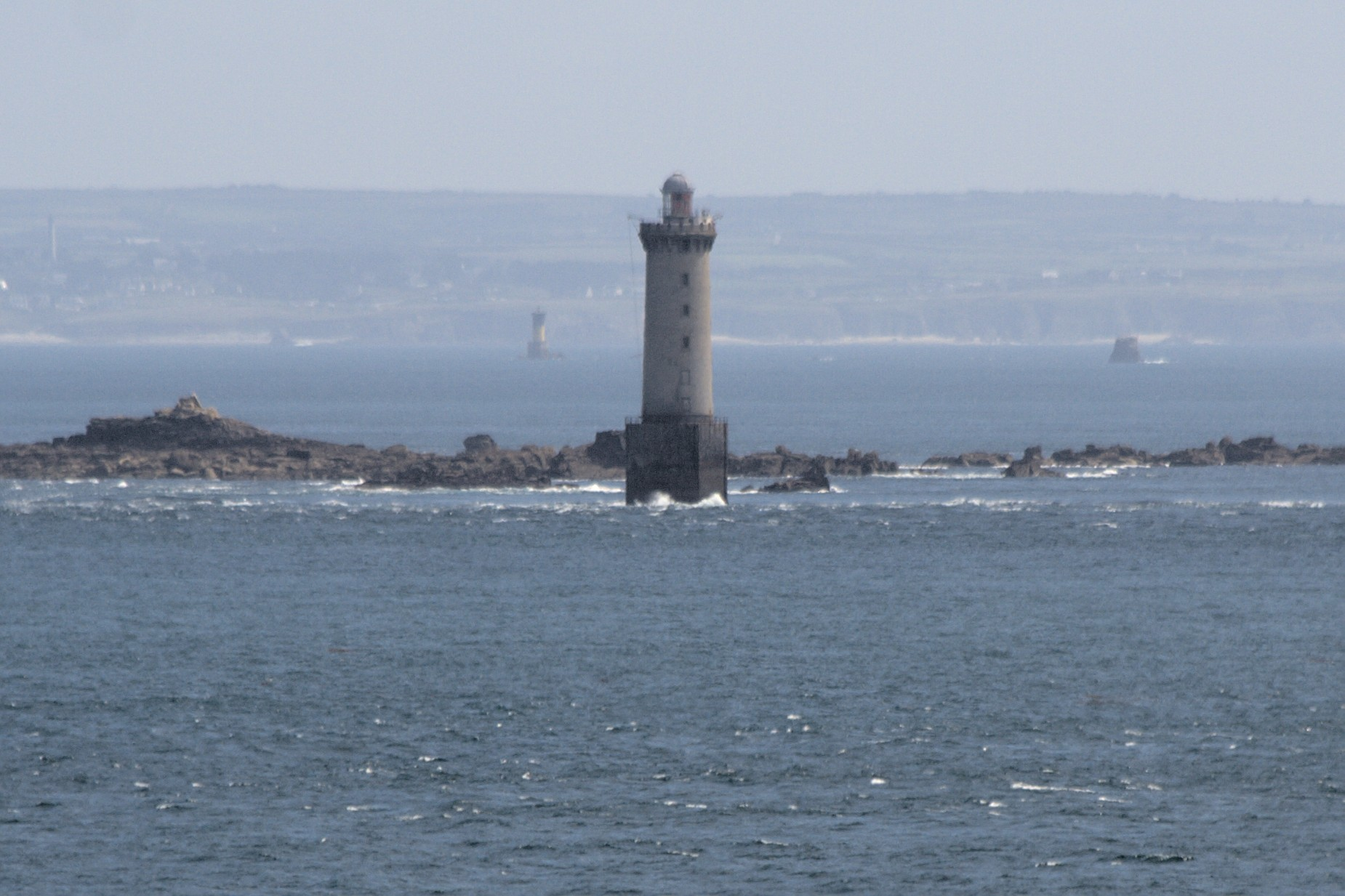
The strait and Kéréon lighthouse, viewed from Ushant

The name Fromveur comes from the Breton words froud, meaning current, and meur meaning great, as the passage can exhibit strong tidal currents, often running at 4 m/s (8 kn). These currents, the second strongest in France after those of the Raz Blanchard in Normandy, make the passage a promising location for tidal power installations. In 2013, GDF Suez announced plans to install a 0.5-megawatt test tidal turbine in the passage in 2014. The Sabella D10 turbine was finally installed in 2015, providing power to the island of Ushant. In September 2023, it supplied 25% of the electricity consumed on the island. Since October 2024, the turbine is operated by Inyanga Marine Energy Group, after Sabella went into administration. Inyanga have a license to operate the turbine until August 2028.
