= Energen Wave Power =

The Energen Wave Power device is a generator that uses the motion of near shore ocean surface waves to create electricity. It is an attenuating wave device designed for extracting energy available from a single wave over a large surface area. It has a simple robust design that will enable it to withstand harsh sea conditions. The design of the generator allows for single or modular installations. Modular installations will reduce costs making power generating sites more financially viable. The size of each generator can be changed to accommodate regional wave conditions to maximise power output and reduce energy unit costs. All power generating equipment is housed in the parallel floating pontoons, providing protection from the harsh corrosive sea conditions.

== Operation ==
The Energen device consists of a series of semi-submerged cylindrical pivoting torque tubes connected to two large cylindrical pontoons. The wave-induced movement of these torque tubes is resisted by a hydraulic system which pumps high pressure oil through hydraulic motors. The hydraulic motors drive electrical generators to produce electricity.

A 50th scale model has been tested at the Council for Scientific and Industrial Research in Stellenbosch and using actual wave data off the South African coast it is estimated that a single device will produce 1.4 MW of power, or 979 GW hours of electricity per annum.

== See also ==
- Wave power
- Ocean energy
- Wave farm
