= Nova Innovation =

Scottish tidal stream turbine developer

Nova Innovation Ltd
- Industry: Tidal energy
- Founded: May 1, 2009; 17 years ago in Edinburgh, UK
- Founder: Dr David Simon Forrest; Dr Gary Connor
- Headquarters: Leith, United Kingdom
- Website: https://novainnovation.com/

Nova Innovation Ltd is a Scottish developer of tidal stream turbines, based in Leith, Edinburgh. They deployed their first 30 kW turbine in 2014. Since then, they have developed and tested a 100 kW seabed mounded two-bladed horizontal-axis tidal stream turbine, and plan to scale this up in future. Up to six of these turbines have been deployed simultaneously in the Bluemull Sound, Shetland since 2016.

They have also announced plans to install turbines in France, Canada and Wales. In November 2023, the company announced it had been awarded Horizon Europe funding to develop a 4 MW array with 16 turbines at the EMEC Fall of Warness tidal test site.

Nova have also diversified into developing floating solar power solutions, with a system tested at Leith Docks in 2023. In June 2024, Nova announced a joint venture with RSK called AquaGen365, to design, build, and install floating solar platforms.

The company hosted Keir Starmer's launch in June 2023 of a Scottish-based publicly owned energy company "Great British Energy". This was held in their turbine factory in Leith.

== History ==
Nova Innovation was set up in 2009 by CEO Simon Forrest and CTO Gary Connor. Both have a PhD from the University of Edinburgh, in Electrical Engineering and Power Systems Engineering respectively.

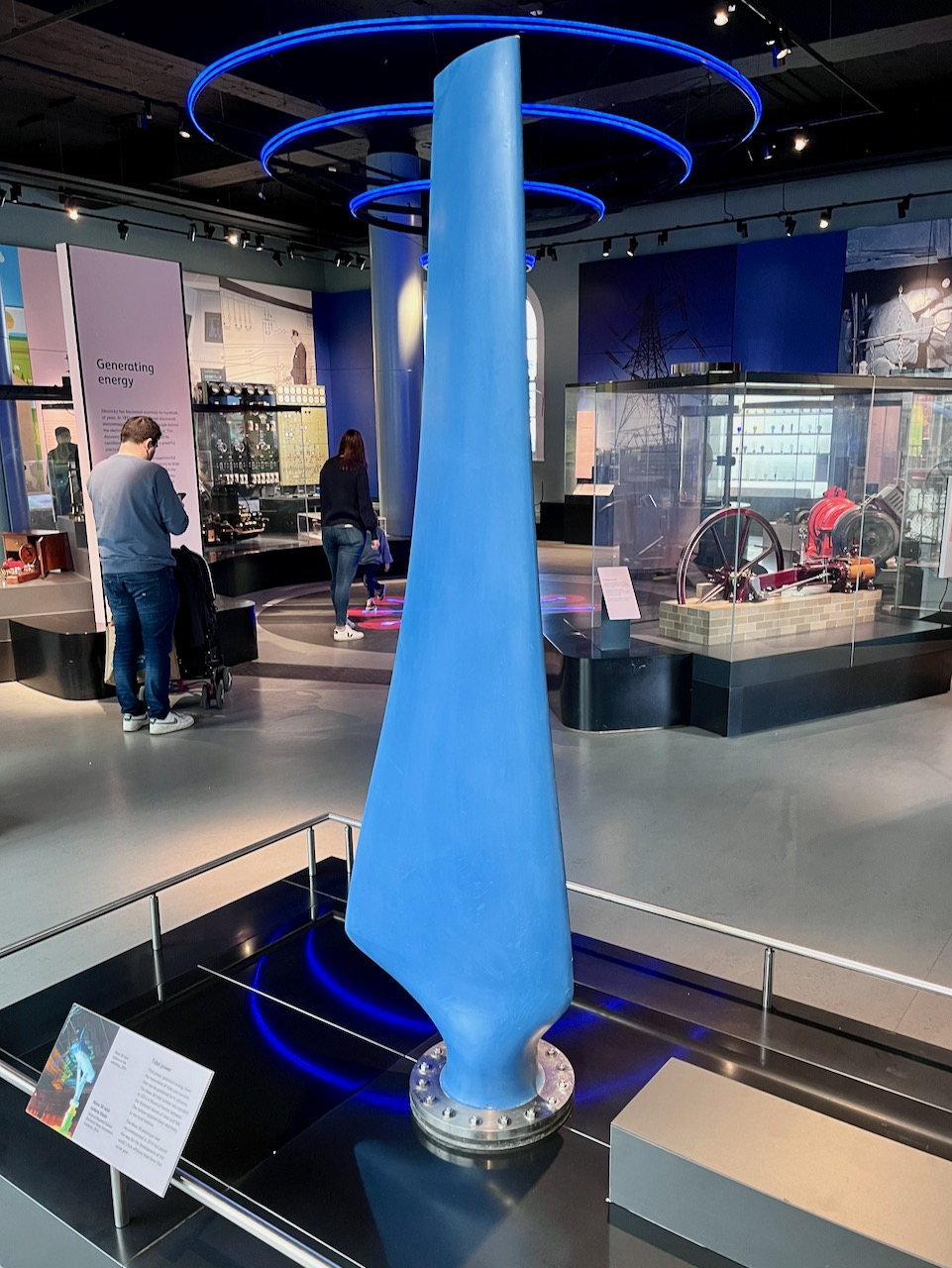
Nova 30kW turbine blade at National Museum of Scotland

=== Nova 30 turbine ===
In April 2014, Nova installed a 30 kW turbine in the Bluemull Sound, in partnership with the North Yell Development Council, making it the "world's first community-owned tidal power generator". This was connected to the local electricity grid by a 1 km subsea cable; helping power an ice house at Cullivoe harbour and up to 30 local homes. The turbine was decommissioned in 2016. The project was supported by the Scottish Government Community and Renewable Energy Scheme.

The Nova 30 turbine was a three-bladed horizontal axis machine, mounted on a gravity foundation that sat on the seabed. It was fabricated by Renfrew based Steel Engineering.

In March 2024, one of the turbine blades went on display at the National Museum of Scotland.

=== Shetland Tidal Array ===
Shetland Tidal Array
- Country: Scotland
- Location: Shetland Isles
- Coordinates: 60°41′59.6″N 0°58′58.1″W
- Status: Operational
- Commission date: 2016

Tidal power station
- Type: Tidal stream generator
- Type of TSG: 3 × 100 kW Nova M100-D

External links
- Website: novainnovation.com

After deploying the Nova 30, the company developed plans for an array of five turbines in the Bluemull Sound, to the northeast of Cullivoe Harbour. The company was awarded £1.9m in grants and loans from Scottish Enterprise, and they raised a further £1.85m from Belgium based green energy company ELSA, part of the IDETA Group. In 2021, the company received a further £6.4m investment from the Scottish National Investment Bank.

The first 100 kW tidal turbine was connected in August 2016, followed by another two similar turbines later that year. The original plan was for an array of five turbines, but in 2018 an amended license was awarded to install six turbines. This including re-configuring the array as part of the Horizon 2020 EnFAIT project. A fourth turbine was added in 2020, then in January 2023 two further turbines were added, making it the largest number of turbines in a tidal-stream array. These turbines were connected by a subsea hub and a single export cable, whereas the previous turbines all had individual cables to shore. However, the three oldest turbines were removed just months later at the end of the EnFAIT project leaving the array at just 0.3 MW. By December 2020 the array had generated 469 MWh through more that 14,000 hours of operation.

All of the turbines were two-bladed horizontal-axis machines, which sat on the seabed on gravity foundations. The first three were Nova M100 turbines which incorporated a gearbox. Nova simplified the design for the later M100-D by incorporating a direct-drive mechanism, reportedly cutting the cost by a third. The six turbines deployed at the site were all given female names: Ailsa, Betty, Charlotte, Eunice, Grace and Hali Hope.

Nova incorporated Tesla batteries alongside the array in 2018, to help even out the variation in power over the six-hour tidal cycle. They later installed an electric vehicle charger at Cullivoe Harbour in March 2021, claiming this was the world's first "tidal powered" charger.

=== Turbine in Étel Estuary, Brittany, France ===
Between March and April 2023, Nova tested a 50 kW turbine in the Étel Estuary, their first turbine installed outwith Scotland. This was supported by the Horizon 2020 funded ELEMENT project. Due to the flow of the river, the tidal resource in the estuary had faster ebb currents than flood currents. The RE50 turbine did not yaw, and was therefore deployed facing into the ebb current minimising the impact of tower shadow and maximising power generation.

== Future projects ==
=== Proposed array in Bay of Fundy, Canada ===
In 2019, Nova was awarded a license from Natural Resources Canada to develop a 1.5 MW array in Petite Passage, Bay of Fundy, Nova Scotia. The scheme was expected to comprise 15 of Nova's 100 kW M100 turbines, starting with an initial phase of five turbines. As with previous turbines, these would be mounted on gravity foundations on the seabed. The turbines were expected to be manufactured in Canada, with the first one commissioned by 2021, however this did not happen. The project secured C$4 million in funding from the Clean Growth Program.

=== Proposed developments in Wales ===
Nova secured £1.2m from the Welsh Government in 2020 to develop a 0.5 MW tidal stream array, to be located in the waters between Ynys Enlli and the Llŷn Peninsula. RSK were appointed to conduct an environmental impact assessment of the project, was to include five 100 kW turbines. Baseline environmental surveys for seabirds and marine mammals were carried out by Bangor University and other partners from 2017–2022. However, Nova announced in Feb 2023 that it was mothballing the project, citing issues with the grid connect and lack of revenue support.

Joint plans were announced in January 2022 by Nova Innovation and Quimper-based Sabella to each develop 6 MW of a 12 MW berth at the Morlais tidal stream project off the coast of Holy Island, Anglesey, North Wales. The first deployments were initially stated for 2023/24, but there have been no further announcements on this.

=== Proposed Òran na Mara Tidal Energy Project ===
In February 2021, Crown Estate Scotland granted Nova an option agreement to develop a 3 MW array in the Sound of Islay. The name Òran na Mara is Gaelic for "song of the sea", and the project would help power the famous distilleries on Islay.

=== Proposed Yell Sound project ===
In February 2022, Crown Estate Scotland granted Nova another option agreement, this time for a 15 MW array in Yell Sound in Shetland. It is claimed this project could meet a third of household electricity demand in Shetland once completed.

=== Feasibility study for Indonesian array ===
Looking further afield, Nova was awarded £200k from Innovate UK in 2021 to conduct a feasibility study into building an array in Indonesia. The project investigated a 7 MW array in the Larantuka Strait.

=== SEASTAR Project ===
In November 2023, the company announced it had been awarded Horizon Europe funding to develop a 4 MW array with 16 turbines at the EMEC Fall of Warness tidal test site, claiming this would be the largest number of turbines installed in a tidal stream array. These would each be 250 kW, scaled up from the existing 100 kW turbines used at Bluemull Sound.

The company is looking to raise £20m in investment, and is considering plans for an initial public offering in future.

In September 2024, Nova was awarded three Contracts for Difference in allocation round 6, to supply a total of 6 MW of electricity at £172/MWh for their SEASTAR and OCEANSTAR projects.
