= Shrouded tidal turbine =

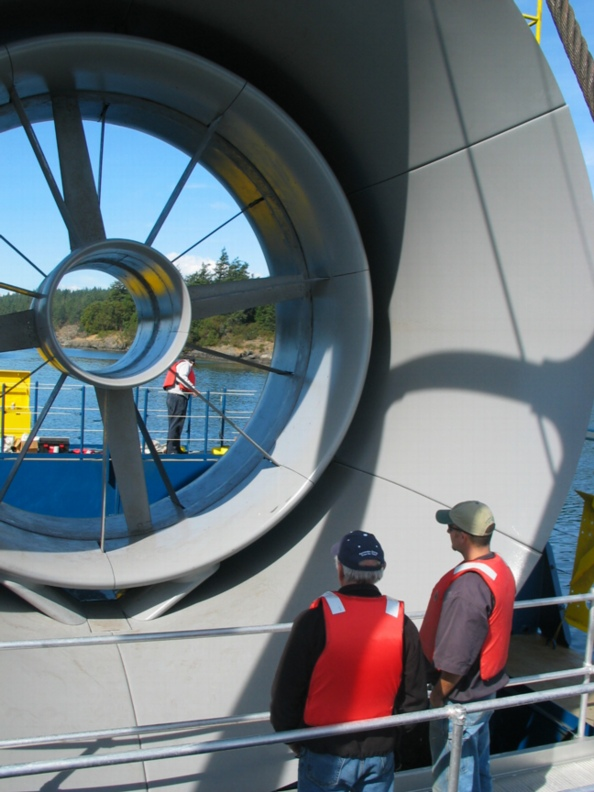
The shrouded turbine Race Rocks Tidal Current Generator before installation at Race Rocks in southern British Columbia in 2006. It operates bi-directionally and has proven to be efficient in contributing to the integrated power system of the area.

The shrouded tidal turbine is an emerging tidal stream technology that has a turbine enclosed in a venturi shaped shroud or duct (ventuduct), producing a sub atmosphere of low pressure behind the turbine. The venturi shrouded turbine is not subject to the Betz limit and allows the turbine to operate at higher efficiencies than the turbine alone by increasing the volume of the flow over the turbine. Claimed improvements vary, from 1.15 to 4 times higher power output than the same turbine minus the shroud. The Betz limit of 59.3% conversion efficiency for a turbine in an open flow still applies, but is applied to the much larger shroud cross-section rather than the small turbine cross-section.

== Principles ==
Considerable commercial interest has been shown in shrouded tidal stream turbines due to the increased power output. They can operate in shallower slower moving water with a smaller turbine at sites where large turbines are restricted. Arrayed across a seaway or in fast flowing rivers, shrouded turbines are cabled to shore for connection to a grid or a community. Alternatively the property of the shroud that produces an accelerated flow velocity across the turbine allows tidal flows formerly too slow for commercial use to be used for energy production.

While the shroud may not be practical in wind, as the next generation of tidal stream turbine design it is gaining more popularity and commercial use. The Tidal Energy Pty Ltd tidal turbine is multidirectional able to face up-stream in any direction and the Lunar Energy turbine bi directional. All tidal stream turbines constantly need to face at the correct angle to the water stream in order to operate. The Tidal Energy Pty Ltd is a unique case with a pivoting base. Lunar Energy use a wide angle diffuser to capture incoming flow that may not be inline with the long axis of the turbine. A shroud can also be built into a tidal fence or barrage increasing the performance of turbines.

== Types of shroud ==
Not all shrouded turbines are the same - the performance of a shrouded turbine varies with the design of the shroud. Not all shrouded turbines have undergone independent scrutiny of claimed performances, as companies closely guard their respective technologies, so quoted performance figures need to be closely scrutinised. Lunar Energy reports a 15%-25% improvement over the same turbine without the shroud. Shrouded turbines do not operate at maximum efficiency when the shroud does not intercept the current flow at the correct angle, which can occur as currents eddy and swirl, resulting in reduced operational efficiency. At lower turbine efficiencies the extra cost of the shroud must be justified, while at higher efficiencies the extra cost of the shroud has less impact on commercial returns. Similarly the added cost of the supporting structure for the shroud has to be balanced against the performance gained. Yawing (pivoting) the shroud and turbine at the correct angle, so it always faces upstream like a wind sock, can increase turbine performance but may need expensive active devices to turn the shroud into the flow. Passive designs can be incorporated, such as floating the shrouded turbine under a pontoon on a swing mooring, or flying the turbine like a kite under water. One design by Tidal Energy Pty Ltd passively yaws the shrouded turbine using a turntable with a peer reviewed claim of 3.84 (384%) increase in efficiency over the same turbine minus the shroud - See Kirke.

=== Advantages ===
- A shroud of suitable geometry can increase the flow velocity across the turbine by 3 to 4 times the open or free stream velocity.
- More power generated means greater returns on investment.
- The number of suitable sites is increased as sites formerly too slow for commercial development become viable.
- Where large cumbersome turbines are not suitable, smaller shrouded turbines can be sea-bed-mounted in shallow rivers and estuaries allowing safe navigation of the water ways.
- Hidden in a shroud, a turbine is less likely to be damaged by floating debris.
- Bio-fouling is also reduced as the turbine is shaded from natural light in shallow water.
- The increased velocities through the turbine effectively water-blast the shroud throat and turbine clean as organisms are unable to attach at increased velocities.
- Described by one manufacturer as 'eco-benign', tidal stream turbines do not interfere with marine life or the environment and have little or no visual amenity impact.

=== Disadvantages ===
- Most shrouded turbines are directional, although one exception is the version off Southern Vancouver Island in British Columbia. One-direction fixed shrouds may not capture flow efficiently - in order for the shroud to produce maximum efficiency to use both flood and ebb tide they need to be yawed like a windmill on a pivot or turntable, or suspended under a pontoon on a marine swing mooring allowing the turbine to always face upstream like a wind sock.
- Shrouded turbine loads are 3 to 4 times those of the open or free stream turbine, so a robust mounting system is necessary. However, this mounting system needs to be designed in such a way as to prevent turbulence being spilled onto the turbine or high-pressure waves occurring near the turbine and detuning performance. Streamlining the mounts and or including structural mounts in the shroud geometry performs two functions, that of supporting the turbine and providing a net benefit of 3 to 4 times the power output.

== Advancements ==
A typical shrouded turbine is unable to harness significant portion of the augmented mass flow inside the shroud. The power extraction can be improved further by placing another coaxial rotor, making it a Shrouded Twin-rotor Turbine. Interestingly, such turbines can operate in multiple configurations: (a) turbine-turbine mode (both rotors acting as turbine and extracting energy from the flow), and (b) turbine-fan mode (the first rotor extracts energy from the flow, whereas the second rotor reduces flow stagnation by imparting energy to the flow). Theoretical analysis of such configurations have revealed significant power augmentation in both these modes with enhanced operational flexibility, depending on inlet flow conditions.
