= Dynamic tidal power =

Proposed electricity generation technology

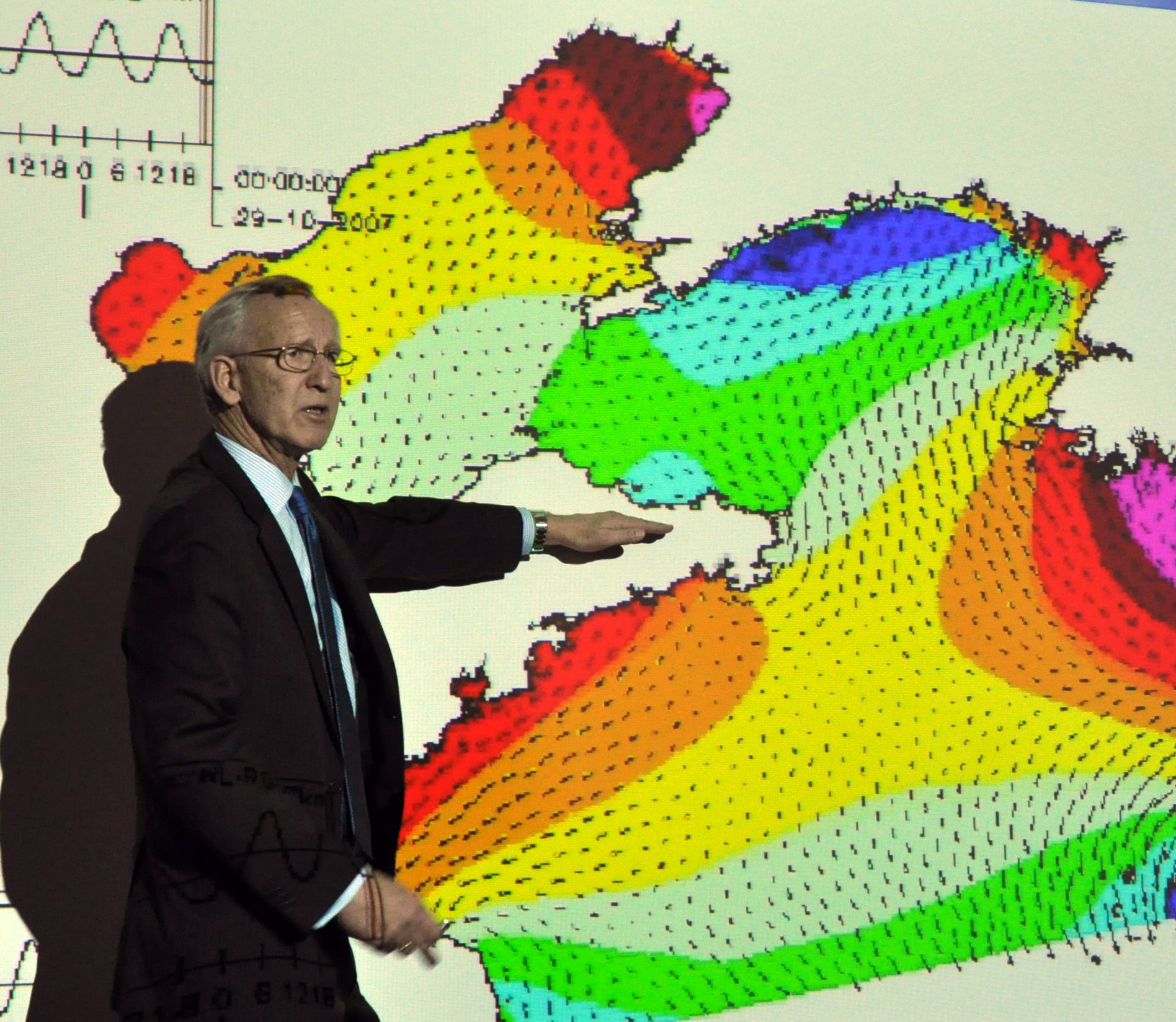
Co-inventor Kees Hulsbergen presenting the principles of DTP at Tsinghua University in Beijing, in February 2010

Dynamic tidal power or DTP is an untried but promising technology for tidal power generation. It would involve creating a long dam-like structure perpendicular to the coast, with the option for a coast-parallel barrier at the far end, forming a large 'T' shape. This long T-dam would interfere with coast-parallel tidal wave hydrodynamics, creating water level differences on opposite sides of the barrier which drive a series of bi-directional turbines installed in the dam. Oscillating tidal waves which run along the coasts of continental shelves, containing powerful hydraulic currents, are common in e.g. China, Korea, and the UK.

The concept was invented and patented in 1997 by Dutch coastal engineers Kees Hulsbergen and Rob Steijn.

A short video explaining the concept was completed in October 2013 and made available in English on YouTube and in Chinese on Youku.

== Description ==
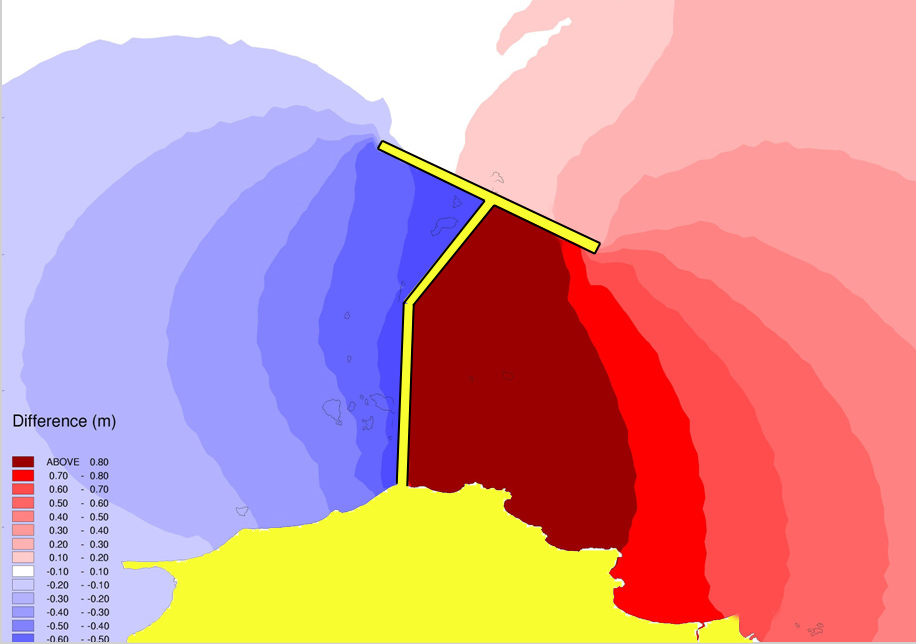
Top-down view of a DTP dam. Blue and dark red colors indicate low and high tides, respectively.

A DTP dam is a long barrier of 30 km or more which is built perpendicular to the coast, running straight out into the sea, without enclosing an area. Along many coasts of the world, the main tidal movement runs parallel to the coastline: the entire mass of the ocean water accelerates in one direction, and later in the day back the other way. A DTP dam is long enough to exert an influence on the horizontal tidal movement, which generates a water level differential (head) over both sides of the dam. The head can be converted into power, using a long series of conventional low-head turbines installed in the dam.

== Maximum head difference ==
Estimates of the maximum head difference that can be obtained from a variety of dam configurations are based on numerical and analytical models. Field information from measured water level differences across natural barriers confirms the creation of significant head. The (maximum) head difference is more than what would be expected in stationary flow situations (such as rivers). The maximum head difference reaches values up to a few meters, which can be attributed to the non-permanent character of the tidal flow (acceleration).

== Benefits ==
=== High power output ===
It is estimated that some of the largest dams could accommodate over 15 GW (15,000 MW) of installed capacity. A DTP dam with 8 GW installed capacity and a capacity factor of about 30%, could generate about 21 TWh annually. To put this number in perspective, an average European person consumes about 6800 kWh per year, so one DTP dam could supply energy for about 3 million Europeans.

=== Stable power ===
The generation of tidal power is highly predictable due to the deterministic nature of tides, and independent of weather conditions or climate change. Power output varies with the tidal phase (ebb & flow, neap & spring) but the shorter terms effects can be avoided by combining two dams, placed at certain distance from each other (in the order of 150–250 km), each generating maximum electricity output when the other is generating minimal output. This provides a predictable and fairly stable base generation to the energy grid.

=== High availability ===
Dynamic tidal power does not require a very high natural tidal range, but instead an open coast where the tidal propagation is alongshore. Such tidal conditions can be found in many places around the world, which means that the theoretical potential of DTP is very high. Along the Chinese coast for example, the total amount of available power is estimated at 80–150 GW.

=== Potential for combined functions ===
The long dam can be combined with various other functions, such as coastal protection, deep sea – and LNG ports, aquaculture facilities, controlled land reclamation and connections between islands and the mainland. These additional functions can share the investment costs, thus helping to lower the price per kWh.

== Challenges ==
A major challenge is that the proof of DTP functioning can only be demonstrated by putting it in practice. Testing the concept of DTP at a small scale within a demonstration project, would not be effective, since almost no power would be yielded. Not even at a dam length of 1 km (0.62 mi) or so, because the DTP principle is such that the power generation capacity increases as the square of the dam length increases (both head and volume increase in a more or less linear manner for increased dam length, resulting in a quadratic increase in power generation). Economic viability is estimated to be reached for dam lengths of about 30 km (19 mi).

== Demonstration project ==
A demonstration project under consideration in China would not involve construction of a dam, but instead feature a newly cut channel through a long peninsula with a narrow isthmus (neck). The channel would feature a head of about 1–2 metres (3.3–6.6 ft), and be fitted with low-head bi-directional turbines, similar to the type which would be used for full-scale DTP.

== Status of technological development ==
No DTP dam has ever been built, although all of the technologies required to build a DTP dam are available. Various mathematical and physical models have been conducted to model and predict the 'head' or water level differential over a dynamic tidal power dam. The interaction between tides and long dams has been observed and recorded in large engineering projects, such as the Delta Works and the Afsluitdijk in the Netherlands. The interaction of tidal currents with natural peninsulas is also well-known, and such data is used to calibrate numerical models of tides. Formulas for the calculation of added mass were applied to develop an analytical model of DTP. Observed water level differentials closely match current analytical and numerical models. Water level differential generated over a DTP dam can now be predicted with a useful degree of accuracy.

Some of the key elements required include:

- Bi-directional turbines (capable of generating power in both directions) for low head, high-volume environments. Operational units exist for seawater applications, reaching an efficiency of over 75%.
- Dam construction methods. This could be achieved by modular floating caissons (concrete building blocks). These caissons would be manufactured on shore and subsequently floated to the dam location.
- Suitable sites to demonstrate DTP. A pilot project of DTP could be integrated with a planned coastal development project, such as a sea bridge, island connection, deep sea port, land reclamation, offshore wind farm, etc., built in a suitable environment for DTP.

== Recent progress ==
In December 2011 the Dutch Ministry of Economy, Agriculture and Innovation (EL&I) awarded a grant funding subsidy to the POWER consortium, led by Strukton and managed by ARCADIS. The maximum grant is about 930.000 euro, which is matched by a similar amount of co-financing from the consortium partners. The POWER group conducts a detailed feasibility study on the development of Dynamic Tidal Power (DTP) in China in a three-year programme jointly conducted with Chinese government institutes. The commitments of the programme to achieve by 2015, registered under the UN Sustainable Energy for All initiative include:

- Determine most suitable sites for DTP implementation in China, Korea, and the UK
- Complete detailed feasibility studies for two DTP pilot power plants in China
- Complete pre-feasibility study for one full-scale DTP power plant in China
- Worldwide dissemination of technical information regarding DTP among relevant target groups

In August 2012, China's National Energy Administration formed a consortium of companies and research institutes, led by the Hydropower and Water Resources Planning and Design General Institute (also known as China Renewable Energy Engineering Institute), to investigate DTP. A bilateral agreement on DTP cooperation was signed between China and the Netherlands on September 27, 2012. Following technical exchange to verify the principles, a modelling study was conducted to select sites. In October 2013, a more in-depth economic analysis study was started to better understand the economic costs and benefits of DTP.

A short video explaining the concept was completed in October 2013 and made available in English on YouTube and in Chinese on Youku.

== See also ==
- Marine energy
- Tidal power
