= Minesto =

Swedish tidal power kite developer

Minesto AB
- Traded as: MINEST:STO
- Predecessor: Saab Group
- Founded: 2007; 18 years ago in Gothenburg, Sweden
- Headquarters: Gothenburg, Sweden
- Key people: Martin Edlund (CEO)
- Products: Tidal power kites
- Number of employees: 36 (2025)
- Website: https://minesto.com

Minesto AB is a Swedish developer of electricity producing tidal kite turbines, based in Gothenburg. As of 2025 the company is focused on developing projects in the Faroe Islands. They also had a manufacturing base in Holyhead, North Wales, although this closed in 2025, and a test facility at Portaferry, Northern Ireland.

The company has tested devices and developed plans to install arrays off the coast of Anglesey, North Wales and in the Faroe Islands. They are also collaborating with National Taiwan Ocean University and TCC Green Energy, a subsidiary of Taiwan Cement, to develop projects in Taiwan.

Minesto was formed in 2007 from the wind department of the Swedish aerospace and defense company Saab Group.

The Minesto devices somewhat resembles a plane, with a wing and control surfaces to steer the device through the water in a figure-of-eight shape. It is tethered to the seabed by a cable that also carries power and communication signals. By "flying" through the water using hydrodynamic lift, the device can travel several time faster than the current speed, allowing it to be used in areas of lower tidal currents than conventional turbines.

== Initial development ==
The concept was initially developed in 2003 by the wind department of the Swedish Saab Group. Minesto was formed as a standalone company in 2007.

The first sea trials of the technology was a scaled-down version of the turbine tested in Strangford Lough, Northern Ireland in 2011. This turbine had a wingspan of 3.0 m, a 1:4 prototype of a turbine with 12 m wingspan and 1 m rotor diameter. The kite was anchored to the seabed by a 27 m long tether, and flew in a loop approximately 20 m across the flow direction and 3 m high, with the highest point approximately 7 m below the surface. This took approximately 6-8 s to complete, with the kite flying at speeds of 2.5-5.5 m/s. This kite had a nacelle mounted below the wing, with a nine-bladed ducted turbine at the front and the control surfaces at the rear.

As of 2023 testing continued in Strangford Lough, focusing on 3 m wingspan prototypes. In 2022, Minesto set up a framework agreement with two local marine service companies to support their activities.

== Holyhead Deep ==
In 2014, Minesto was awarded a seabed lease agreement from The Crown Estate for a 10 MW project in the Holyhead Deep. This is a depression in the Irish Sea to the west of the West Anglesey Demonstration Zone, now the Morlais site. It is approximately 6.5 km offshore, and was consented by Natural Resources Wales in April 2017.

In 2017, Minesto submitted a scoping report for an 80 MW tidal kite array to be developed at the Holyhead Deep site. Although the company have a lease agreement for a 10 MW array, they state that the larger array would be more economical, with the levelized cost of electricity reduced by half.

Between July and November 2018 the company tested a 500 kW Deep Green DG500 prototype of their tidal kite device in the Holyhead Deep. The turbine was connected to a buoy which analysed the power produced, but it was not connected to the GB Grid. In August 2019, Minesto redeployed the Deep Green DG500 turbine in the Holyhead Deep for further testing.

The gravity base structure the kite was tethered onto was located at 53°17′49.8″N 4°47′57.3″W.

Minesto again announced plans in September 2021 to develop the Holygead Deep tidal array, proposing to install a 1.2 MW by the end of 2022. However, by March 2022 they decided to focus on their projects in the Faroe Islands, citing "supply chain issues". Following the closure of their Welsh office in July 2025, CEO Martin Edlund said they "remain fully committed to our tidal site and build-out plan for Holyhead Deep".

== Faroe Islands ==
Two 100 kW Dragon 4 turbines were installed at Vestmannasund in the Faroe Islands in 2022, supplying electricity to the local grid via SEV. These have a 4.9 m wingspan, 1.3 m diameter rotor, and weigh 2.7 tonnes. They are tethered to the seabed by a 40 m long cable.

In November 2023, Minesto shipped a 1.2 MW Dragon 12 turbine manufactured and tested in Sweden to the Faroes. This weighs 28 tonnes, has a wingspan of 12 m, and a turbine diameter of 3.5 m. In January 2024, the grid connection was installed for this and the launch and recovery system (LARS) tested. In February 2024, Minesto announced the Dragon 12 was successfully deployed and connected to the Faroes grid.

The company have plans to build four arrays of 20–40 MW, totaling 120 MW in the Faroe Islands, reportedly supplying 40% of the islands electricity demand. In February 2024, they announced more ambitious plans for 200 MW to be developed, targeting Hestfjord for the next project.

In June 2025, a consortium led by Minesto was awarded SEK 25 million (approximately $2.6m) from the Swedish Energy Agency, as part of a two-year SEK 56 million project in the Faroe Islands to build a "complete microgrid installation". The consortium also includes Capture Energy as the microgrid provider, the Faroes utility SEV, and the Swedish Environmental Research Institute IVL.
