= Marine current power =

Extraction of power from ocean currents

Marine currents can carry large amounts of water, largely driven by the tides, which are a consequence of the gravitational effects of the planetary motion of the Earth, the Moon and the Sun. Augmented flow velocities can be found where the underwater topography in straits between islands and the mainland or in shallows around headlands plays a major role in enhancing the flow velocities, resulting in appreciable kinetic energy. The Sun acts as the primary driving force, causing winds and temperature differences. Because there are only small fluctuations in current speed and stream location with minimal changes in direction, ocean currents may be suitable locations for deploying energy extraction devices such as turbines. Other effects such as regional differences in temperature and salinity and the Coriolis effect due to the rotation of the Earth are also major influences. The kinetic energy of marine currents can be converted in much the same way that a wind turbine extracts energy from the wind, using various types of open-flow rotors.

== Energy potential ==
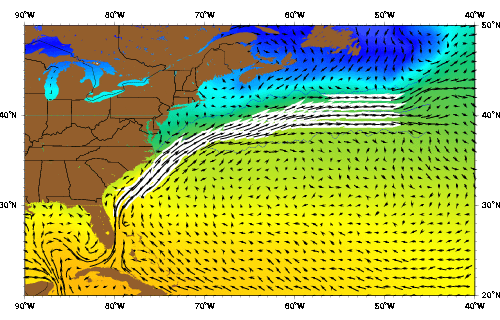
Vector Diagram of current flow along the east coast of the United States.

The total worldwide power in ocean currents has been estimated to be about 5,000 GW, with power densities of up to 15 kW/m2. The relatively constant extractable energy density near the surface of the Florida Straits Current is about 1 kW/m2 of flow area. It has been estimated that capturing just 1/1,000th of the available energy from the Gulf Stream, which has 21,000 times more energy than Niagara Falls in a flow of water that is 50 times the total flow of all the world's freshwater rivers, would supply Florida with 35% of its electrical needs. The image to the right illustrates the high density of flow along the coast, noting the high velocity white northward flow, perfect for extraction of ocean current energy. Countries that are interested in and pursuing the application of ocean current energy technologies include the European Union, Japan, the United States, and China.

The potential of electric power generation from marine tidal currents is enormous. There are several factors that make electricity generation from marine currents very appealing when compared to other renewables:

- The high load factors resulting from the fluid properties. The predictability of the resource, so that, unlike most of other renewables, the future availability of energy can be known and planned for.
- The potentially large resource that can be exploited with little environmental impact, thereby offering one of the least damaging methods for large-scale electricity generation.
- The feasibility of marine-current power installations to provide also base grid power, especially if two or more separate arrays with offset peak-flow periods are interconnected.

== Technologies for marine-current-power generation ==
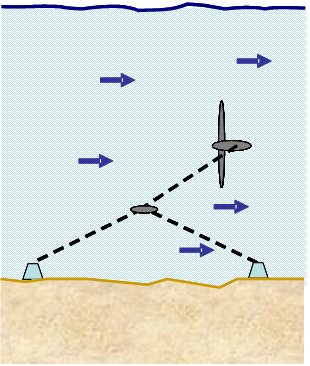
Illustration of windpower-inspired axial-flow turbine used for marine power generation

There are several types of open-flow devices that can be used in marine-current-power applications; many of them are modern descendants of the water wheel or similar. However, the more technically sophisticated designs, derived from wind-power rotors, are the most likely to achieve enough cost-effectiveness and reliability to be practical in a massive marine-current-power future scenario. Even though there is no generally accepted term for these open-flow hydro turbines, some sources refer to them as water-current turbines. There are three main types of water current turbines that might be considered: axial-flow horizontal-axis propellers (with both variable-pitch or fixed-pitch), underwater kites and cross-flow Darrieus rotors. The rotor types may be combined with any of the three main methods for supporting water-current turbines: floating moored systems, sea-bed mounted systems, and intermediate systems. Sea-bed-mounted monopile structures constitute the first-generation marine current power systems. They have the advantage of using existing (and reliable) engineering know-how, but they are limited to relatively shallow waters (about 20 to 40 meters (66 to 131 feet) depth).

== History and application ==
The possible use of marine currents as an energy resource began to draw attention in the mid-1970s after the first oil crisis. In 1974 several conceptual designs were presented at the MacArthur Workshop on Energy, and in 1976 the British General Electric Co. undertook a partially government-funded study which concluded that marine current power deserved more detailed research. Soon after, the ITD-Group in UK implemented a research program involving a year of performance testing of a 3-m hydroDarrieus rotor deployed at Juba on the White Nile.

The 1980s saw a number of small research projects to evaluate marine current power systems. The main countries where studies were carried out were the UK, Canada, and Japan. In 1992–1993 the Tidal Stream Energy Review identified specific sites in UK waters with suitable current speed to generate up to 58 TWh/year. It confirmed a total marine current power resource capable theoretically of meeting some 19% of the UK electricity demand.

In 1994–1995 the EU-JOULE CENEX project identified over 100 European sites ranging from 2 to 200 km^{2}of sea-bed area, many with power densities above 10 MW/km^{2}. Both the UK Government and the EU have committed themselves to internationally negotiated agreements designed to combat global warming. In order to comply with such agreements, an increase in large-scale electricity generation from renewable resources will be required. Marine currents have the potential to supply a substantial share of future EU electricity needs. The study of 106 possible sites for tidal turbines in the EU showed a total potential for power generation of about 50 TWh/year. If this resource is to be successfully utilized, the technology required could form the basis of a major new industry to produce clean power for the 21st century.

Contemporary applications of these technologies can be found here: List of tidal power stations. Since the effects of tides on ocean currents are so large, and their flow patterns are quite reliable, many ocean current energy extraction plants are placed in areas of high tidal flow rates.

Research on marine current power is conducted at, among others, Uppsala University in Sweden, where a test unit with a straight-bladed Darrieus type turbine has been constructed and placed in the Dal river in Sweden.

== Environmental effects ==
Ocean currents are instrumental in determining the climate in many regions around the world. While little is known about the effects of removing ocean current energy, the impacts of removing current energy on the farfield environment may be a significant environmental concern. The typical turbine issues with blade strike, entanglement of marine organisms, and acoustic effects still exists; however, these may be magnified due to the presence of more diverse populations of marine organisms using ocean currents for migration purposes. Locations can be further offshore and therefore require longer power cables that could affect the marine environment with electromagnetic output. The Tethys database provides access to scientific literature and general information on the potential environmental effects of ocean current energy.

== See also ==
- Ocean thermal energy conversion – Extracting energy from the ocean
- Tidal power – Technology to convert the energy from tides into useful forms of power
- Tidal stream generator – Type of tidal power generation technology
- Wave power – Transport of energy by wind waves, and the capture of that energy to do useful work
