= Evopod =

Tidal energy device

Coordinates: 54.388°N 5.566°W

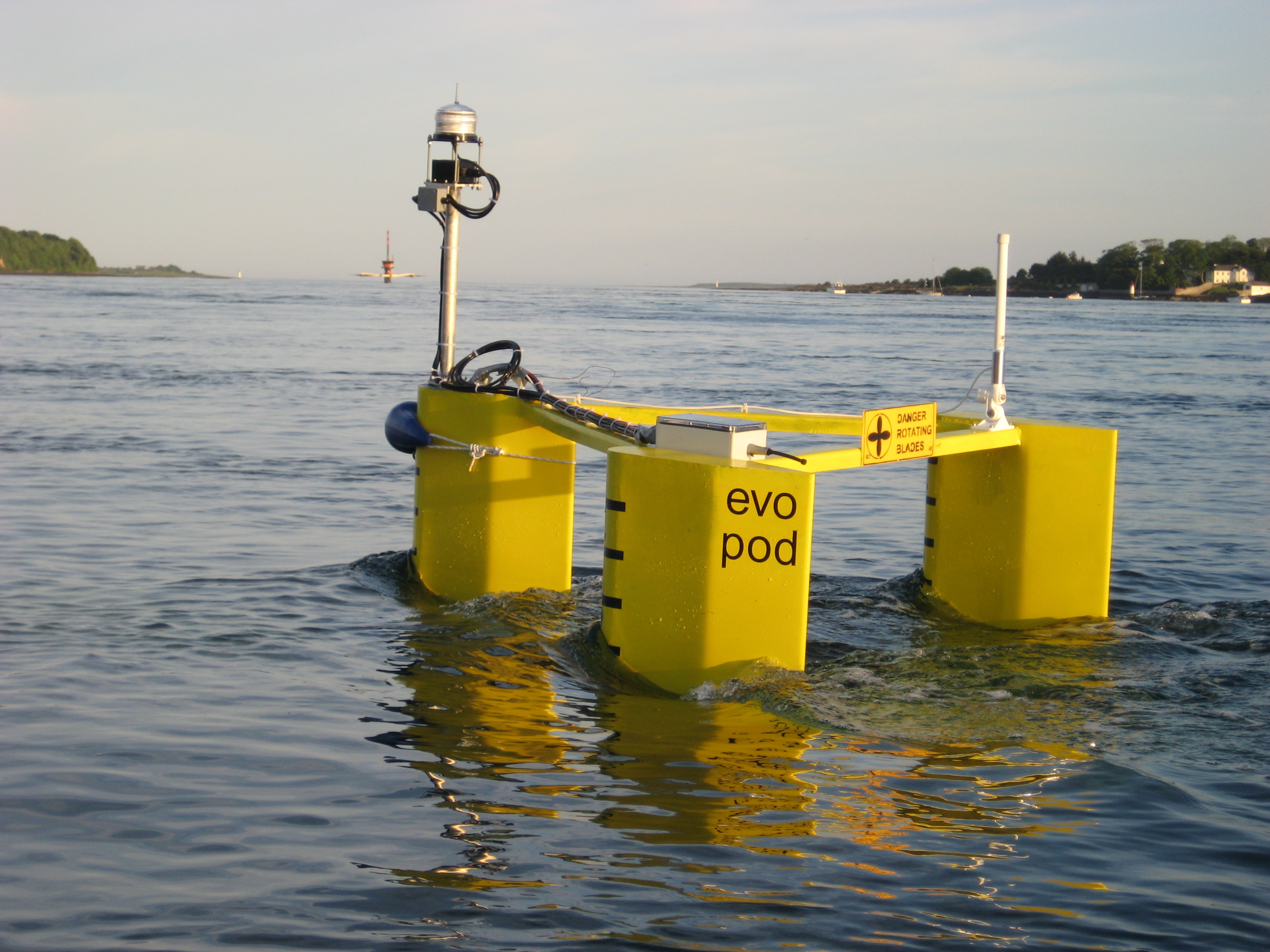
1/10 scale Evopod installed in Strangford Lough during 2008.

Evopod is a unique tidal energy device being developed by a UK-based company Oceanflow Energy Ltd for generating electricity from tidal streams and ocean currents. It can operate in exposed deep water sites where severe wind and waves also make up the environment.

Oceanflow Energy Ltd was formed in 2001, based in North Shields, Tyne And Wear near Newcastle upon Tyne.

Several small-scale prototypes have been tested between 2006 and 2017.

== Floating tethered turbines ==
=== Advantages ===
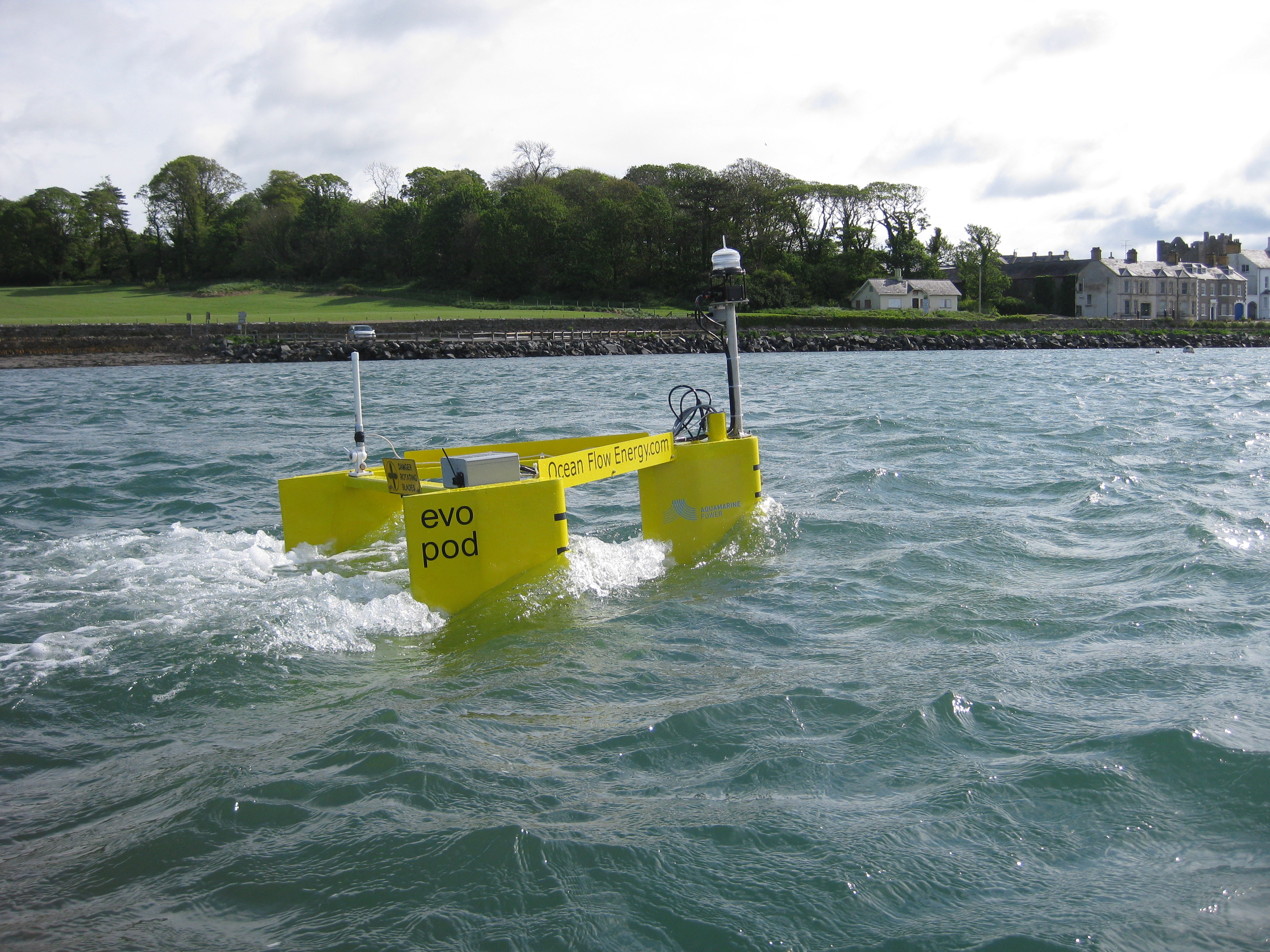
Evopod - Installed in Strangford Lough 2009

- The flow speed in tidal streams and ocean currents tends to be fastest near the surface and falls off in speed as one descend in the water column. As the power that can be extracted from the free flowing water is proportional to the velocity cubed, then a 10% increase in flow speed equates to a 33% increase in power per unit swept area of the turbine.
- The flow is generally more consistent in the top 1/3 of the water column as it is well away from disturbances created by the seabed topography.
- The drag force on turbines of the same power output is proportionally less for a turbine in faster flow (positioned in the upper part of the water column) than a turbine in slower flow (positioned in the lower part of the water column).
- A floating device does not require a flat seabed as the pile anchors require relatively little space and there is no structure on the seabed.
- Turbines supported by floating platforms are more readily accessible for maintenance than those on the seabed.
- Maintaining watertight seals is less problematic for devices positioned higher in the water column as they are not subject to such extreme static pressures.
- Floating devices that are fitted with navigation lights and markings are more readily identifiable under international navigation regulations than unmarked submerged turbines.

=== Disadvantages ===
- Floating devices are subject to ocean wave action which can induce motions that will impact on the performance of the turbines they support; semi-submerged devices such as Evopod are designed to be a stable platform in waves so that they can operate for longer and extract more energy from the wave particle velocity. Waves large enough to have an adverse effect on Evopod would affect turbines in all parts of the water column.
- Ocean waves create an orbital movement of the water particles which will add or subtract from the steady ocean current or tidal stream velocity as the wave passes the turbine. Without proper blade pitch or power take-off control systems this could lead to the blade stalling and loss of power output. With proper control systems it is possible to extract this kinetic energy from the waves, much as a wind turbine does in response to wind gusts. The wave particle velocity for short wave reduces with water depth and is therefore less of an issue for deeply submerged turbines. As the wavelength gets longer than it becomes a shallow water wave where there is little change in velocity in the water column.
- The vertical component of the mooring load induced by the drag of the turbine can pull a floating platform under the water unless it is adequately compensated for by change in buoyancy forces, e.g. the submergence of the struts on Evopod, or hydrodynamic lift forces (lifting foils). Tests have shown residual buoyancy in Evopods is sufficient to withstand these forces with the extra bonus of improve system stability.
- Floating devices have to be robust enough to withstand impact from flotsam and in Northern latitudes may need to be designed to cope with ice floes. This is however true for all turbines as flotsam may be fully submerged and therefore impact any seabed turbine.

== Design features ==
=== Hull design and rotating midwater buoy ===
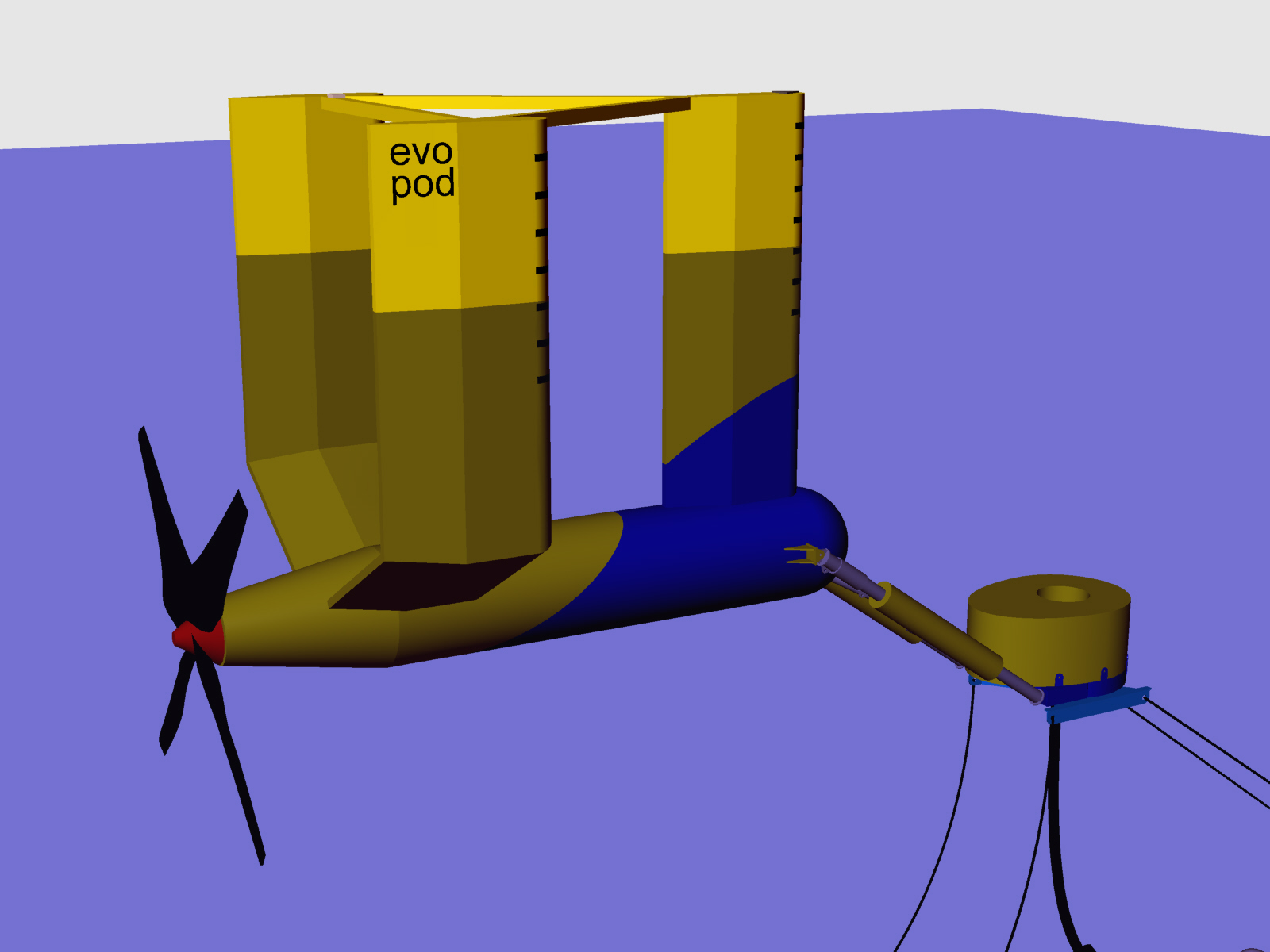
A 3d rendering of Evopod.

The device differentiates itself from other tidal turbines in that the turbine is mounted on a floating, semi-submerged body that is tethered to the seabed. The power generation equipment is similar to that of a wind turbine and is housed in the cylindrical shaped watertight lower hull, which is deeply submerged below the water line and supported by small waterplane area surface piercing struts.

One variant of this patented hull concept has three vertical struts that pierce the water surface, much like a multi-hull SWATH design. The two transversely separated aft struts provide the stability that is needed to resist the torque reacted by the single turbine/generator unit. The configuration of the struts also ensure that the device weathervanes about its midwater mooring buoy such that it always points into the direction of the current.

The device is moored by a mid-water buoy, which is fixed to the seabed by four spread mooring lines which are anchored to the sea-bed by pile or gravity anchors. The buoy design is also unique in that it encompasses a geo-fixed part that is anchored to the seabed and a rotating part that is linked to Evopod by a rigid yoke. The turbine drag forces are therefore transmitted through a bearing system linking the fixed and rotating parts of the buoy. A slip ring power export swivel is located in the buoy so that twist is not imparted into the umbilical cable that takes the power from the midwater buoy to the seabed. A subsea power export cable links the umbilical's seabed connection point to the shore.

With the weather-vaning hull design and rotational midwater buoy, Evopod generates electricity with both the ebb and flood tides by always pointing into the tide's direction of flow. This gives it a generating time of roughly 20 hours per/lunar day (approx 24hrs 50 minutes).

In comparison to other marine bodies that float on the surface of the ocean, Evopod's semi-submerged hull form is hardly affected by the passing waves. It is also designed to be readily detachable from the mid-water buoy for recovery operations. Developing safe installation, maintenance and recovery operations in the hazardous environment of fast flowing currents is one of the biggest challenges facing tidal energy device developers.

The device is designed for deep water sites, such as the Pentland Firth (Up to 60meters water depth, flow speed 6 m/s). Deep water sites in UK waters have the fastest flow speeds and have the greatest potential for electricity generation.

== Testing and collaboration ==
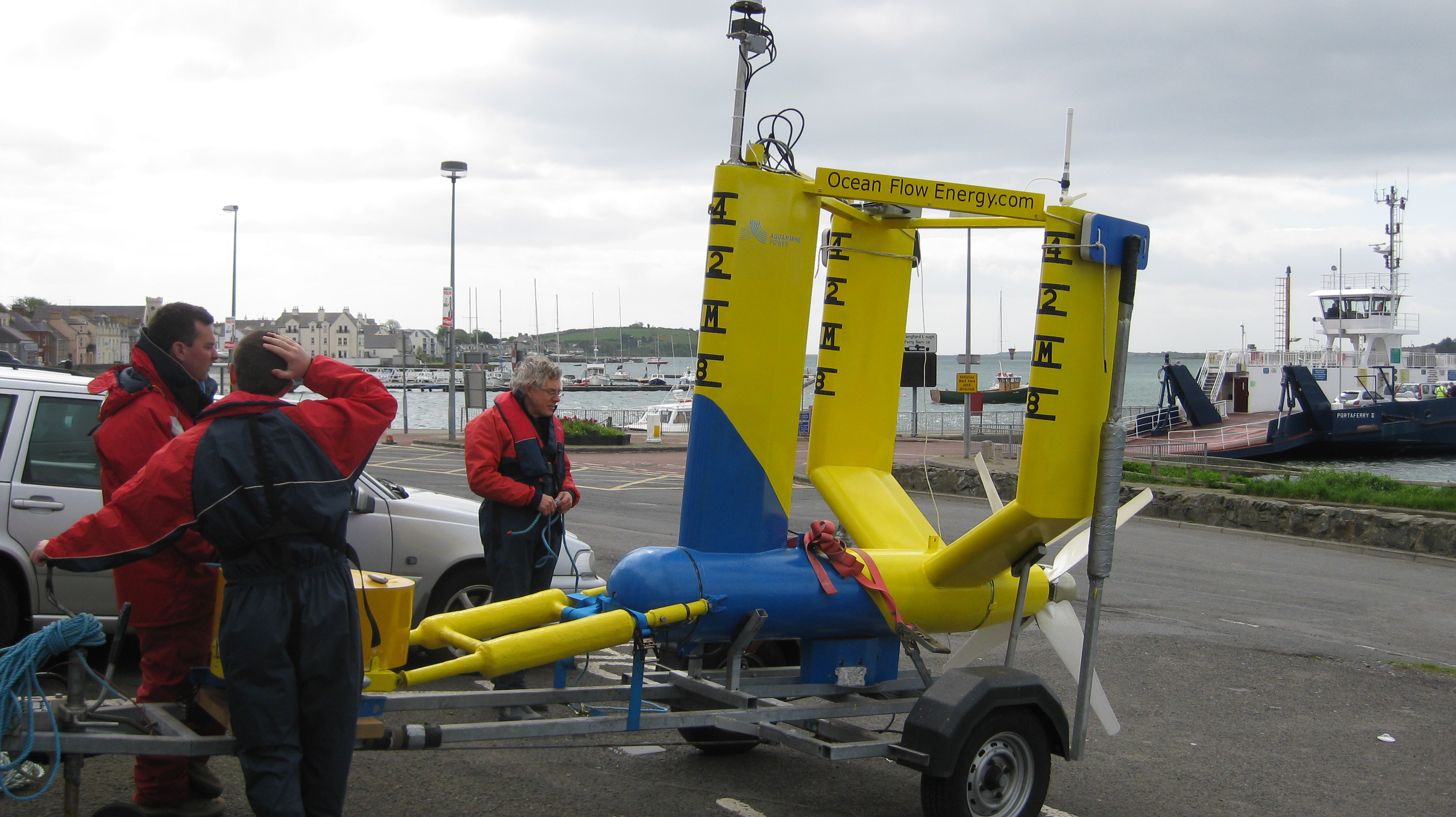

=== Evopod 1/40th scale tank testing, Newcastle University, England ===
In 2006, a 1/40th scale model of Evopod was initially tested in the test tank of Newcastle University during a proof of concept phase.

=== 1kW Evopod tidal test facility demonstration, Tees Barrage, England ===
The 1/10 scale device was initially used to demonstrate the tidal test facilities at the Tees Barrage in Thornaby-on-Tees near Middlesbrough, UK by Narec (National Renewable Energy Centre).

=== 1kW Evopod sea testing, Portaferry, Northern Ireland ===
In 2008 a 1/10 scale Evopod device was installed and tested in the tidal flow through Strangford Narrows near Portaferry, Northern Ireland. Over a period of two years the device collected data but was not connected to the grid under the Supergen Marine Energy Research Programme in collaboration with Queen's University Belfast, amongst others. In 2011 the device was upgraded to include a power export solution which feeds Evopod's generated power onshore to the Queen's University Marine Laboratory. The power is currently fed into the mains circuit of the Marine Laboratory, with plans to be fully grid connected in the near future.

=== 35kW Evopod sea testing, Sanda Sound, Scotland ===
In 2010 Oceanflow Energy were awarded a Scottish WATERS grant to "Build and deploy the ‘Evopod’, a 35 kilowatt floating grid connected tidal energy turbine at Sanda Sound in South Kintyre", between Sanda Island and the Kintyre Peninsula.

By 2013, they had collaborated with Siemens to develop the E35 turbine, with a 4.5 metres (15 ft) diameter rotor. The device was tested for over a year from 7 August 2014 until 7 September 2015, before being removed for maintenance. The aim was then to redeploy the turbine and connect it via a subsea transformer and cable to Southend.

In March 2017, the company announced they were ceasing testing at Sanda Sound.

=== 1kW Evopod sea testing, Faro Channel, Ria Formosa, Portugal ===
In 2017, the 1kW E1 Evopod was tested in the Faro-Olhão Inlet of the Ria Formosa, in southern Portugal as part of the SCORE project (Sustainability of using Ria Formosa Currents On Renewable Energy production). The device was installed on 8 June, and was tested until November 2017.

== Awards ==
Oceanflow Energy and Evopod have won several awards, the most recent being the Shell Springboard Regional award in February 2009. It has also won awards for “innovation of the year” and “green business of the year” in the North East of England.

== See also ==
- Tidal Power
- Tees Barrage
- Strangford Lough
- Electricity Generation
- NaREC
