= List of tidal barrages =

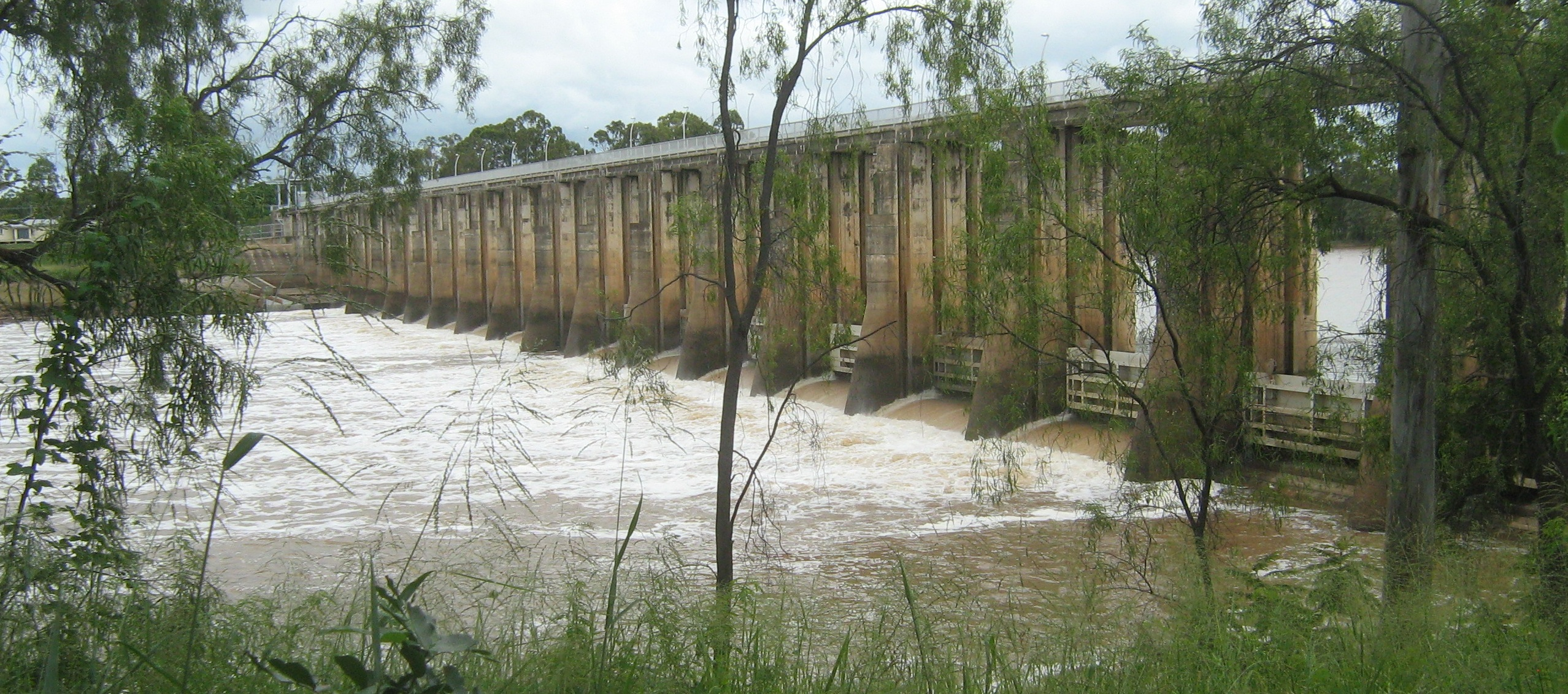
The Fitzroy River Barrage in Queensland, Australia

A tidal barrage is an artificial obstruction at the mouth of a tidal watercourse, in contrast to a normal barrage along a river's inland course.

== Purpose ==
The common primary functions of a barrage are:

- Increase the depth of a river (similar to a weir)
- Maintain a separation between fresh and salt water
- Reduce the risk of tidal flooding up the river

Secondary functions may include:

- Tidal power generation
- Artificial whitewater leisure centres
- Form a coastal reservoir

== Notable barrages ==
Barrage name	Image	Location	Waterway	Description	Notes
Cardiff Bay		Cardiff, Wales	Cardiff Bay	1.1 km (0.68 mi) long	
Fitzroy River		Rockhampton, Queensland, Australia	Fitzroy River	Used for water supply and irrigation; incorporates a fish ladder	
Goolwa		Coorong, South Australia	River Murray	A series of five barrages	
Marina		Singapore	Marina Channel	Formed at the confluence of five rivers: 350 m (1,150 ft) long	
Prakasam		Andhra Pradesh, India	Krishna River	1,223.5 m (4,014 ft) long; connects the Vijayawada and Guntur districts	
Swansea		Swansea, Wales	River Tawe	Incorporates a pumped-storage hydroelectric power station, powered by tidal power	
Tees		Stockton-on-Tees, England, UK	River Tees	Comprises a river barrage, road bridge, footbridge, barge lock, fish pass and access point to a white water course	
West Sea		Namp'o, North Korea	Taedong River	An 8 km-long (5.0 mi) system of dams, three lock chambers, and 36 sluices	

== Power station barrages ==
- Rance Tidal Power Station
- Annapolis Royal Generating Station (decommissioned)
- Sihwa Lake Tidal Power Station
- Kislaya Guba Tidal Power Station
- Jiangxia Tidal Power Station

== Proposed barrages ==
- Severn Barrage across the River Severn between Wales and England
- Mersey Barrage across the Mersey Estuary in England

== See also ==
- List of tidal power stations
- Floodgate
- Thames Barrier
