= Uldolmok Tidal Power Station =

Tidal power station in South Korea

- Country: South Korea
- Location: Uldolmok, Jindo
- Coordinates: 34°33′56″N 126°18′36″E
- Status: Operational
- Commission date: May 14, 2009
- Construction cost: US$10 million

Tidal power station
- Type: Tidal barrage
- Barrage length: 3,260 m (10,696 ft)
- Barrage width: 300 m (980 ft)
- Crosses: Uldolmok Strait
- Channel speed: 6.5 m/s (21.3 ft/s)

Power generation
- Nameplate capacity: 1,500 KW
- Annual net output: 2.4 GWh

Uldolmok Tidal Power Station is a tidal power station in Uldolmok, Jindo County, South Korea. The plant was commissioned in May 14, 2009 by the South Korean government. The plant cost US$10 million and has an installed capacity of 1,000 KW (1 MW), generating 2.4 GWh annually, sufficient to meet the demand of 430 households. Additional 500 kW was commissioned in June 2011.

The South Korean government plans to increase this capacity of 1 to 90 megawatts (1,300 to 120,700 hp) by the end of the year 2013, increasing the demand cover to 46,000 households, while simultaneously working on the 254 megawatts (341,000 hp) Sihwa Lake Tidal Power Station. Part of the goal of generating 5,260 GWh through tidal power by 2020.

The Uldolmok Strait experiences tidal water speeds that exceed 6.5 m/s (21.3 ft/s) with the width of the strait being approximately 300 m (980 ft).

== See also ==
- List of power stations in South Korea
- List of largest power stations in the world
