= Goolwa Barrages =

Series of five barrages at the River Murray mouth, South Australia

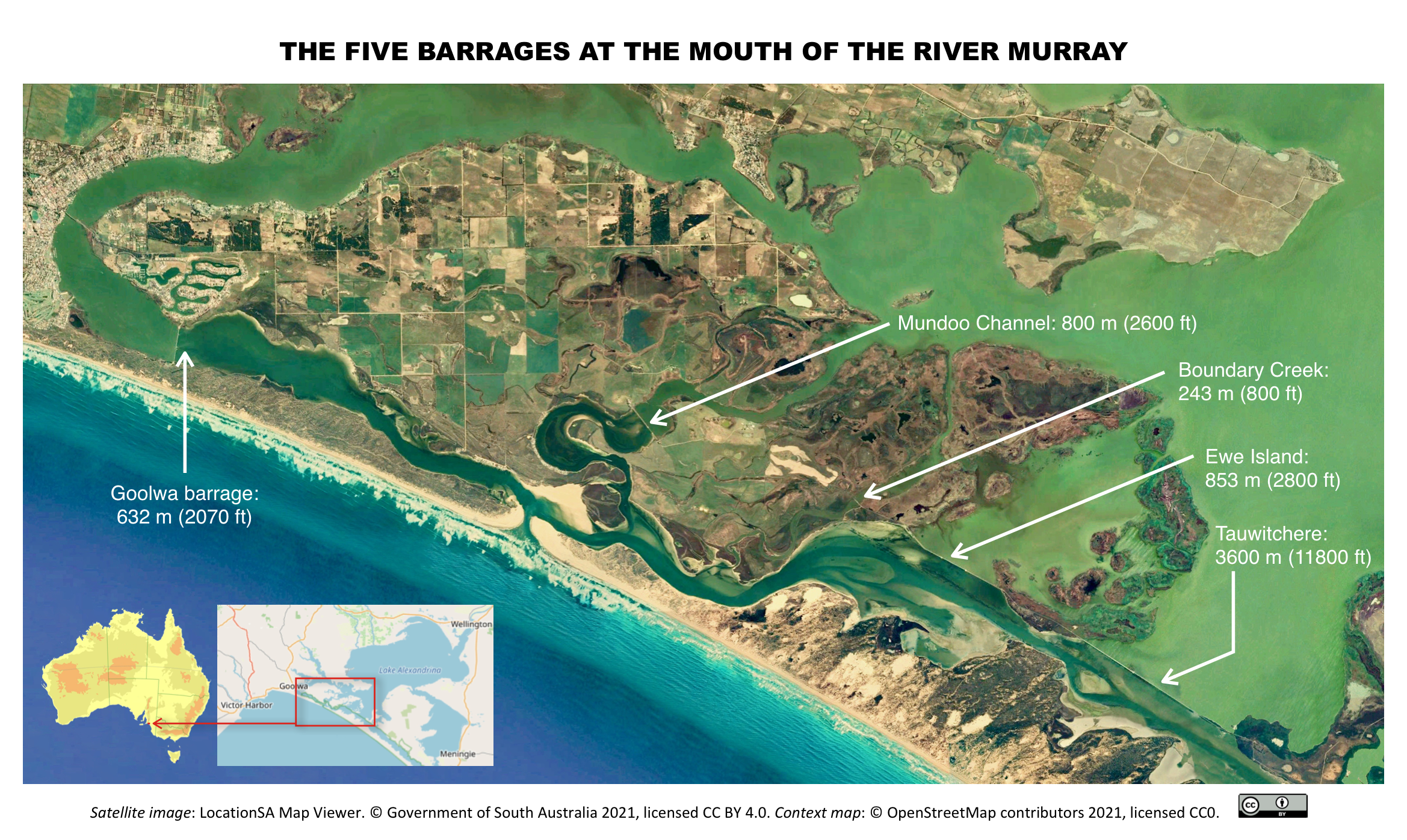
- A map showing the location of each of the Goolwa Barrages

- Location of the barrages in South Australia
- Interactive map of Goolwa Barrages
- Country: Australia
- Location: Coorong National Park, South Australia
- Coordinates: 35°31′43″S 138°48′29″E
- Purpose: Flood control
- Status: Operational
- Construction began: 1935
- Opening date: 1940
- Built by: Engineering and Water Supply Department
- Owner: Murray-Darling Basin Authority
- Operator: SA Water

Dam and spillways
- Type of dam: Barrage
- Impounds: River Murray
- Length: various

The Goolwa Barrages comprise five tidal barrages in the channels separating Lake Alexandrina from the sea at the mouth of the River Murray, near Goolwa, in the Coorong National Park, in South Australia. They were constructed principally to reduce salinity levels in the lower reaches of the River Murray, Lake Alexandrina and Lake Albert, but also to stabilise the river level, for both upstream irrigation and pumping.

== History ==
Prior to the construction of the barrages, during periods of low river flow, tidal effects and the intrusion of seawater were felt up to 250 kilometres (160 miles) upstream from the mouth of the River Murray, approximately as far inland as the river port at present-day Swan Reach.

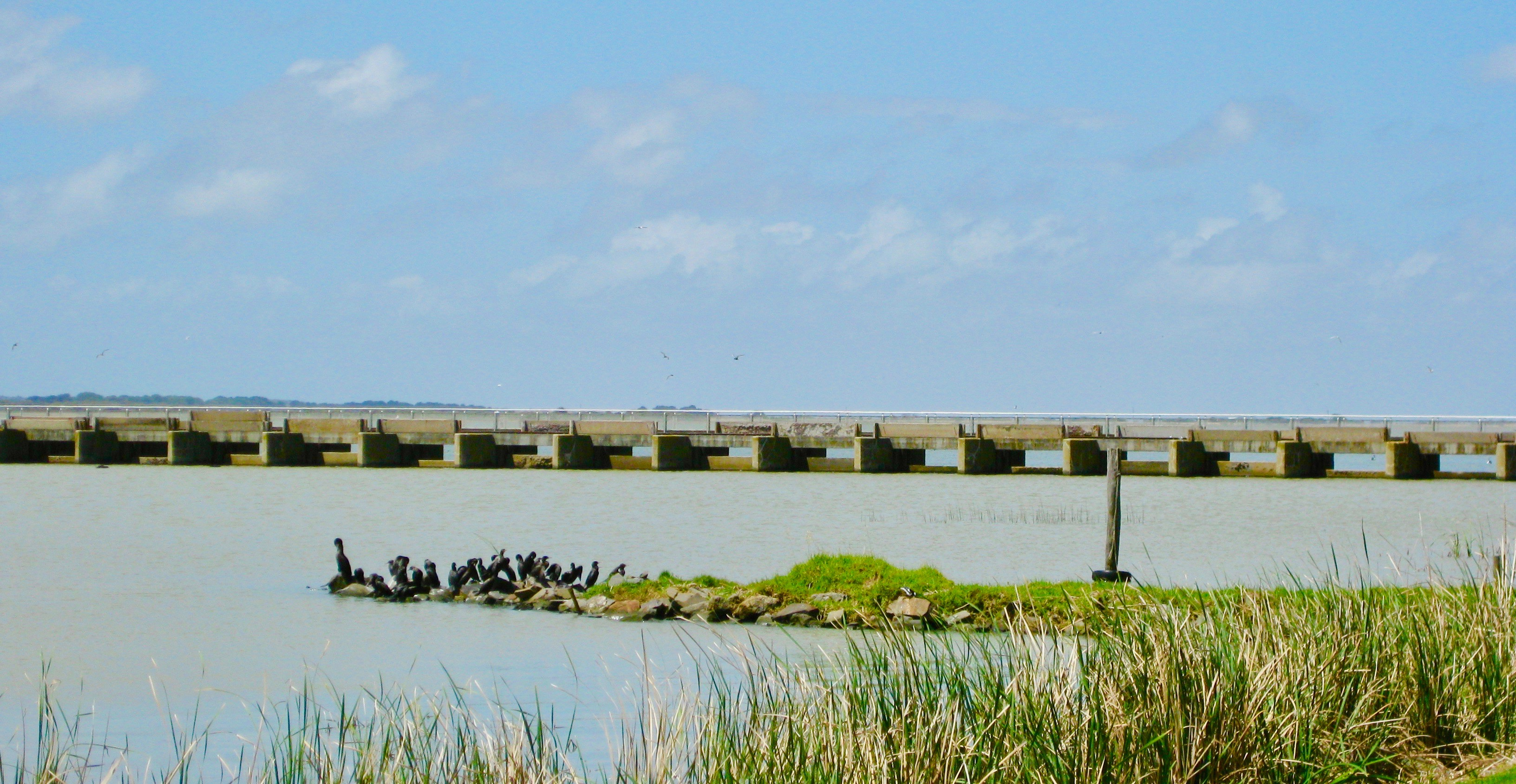
Goolwa Barrage looking towards Hindmarsh Island

From the 1900s, with the advent of large irrigation schemes, landowners along the lower reaches of the river strongly urged for the construction of barrages, primarily to keep the water fresh in the lower reaches of the River Murray, as well as Lake Albert and Lake Alexandrina.

In 1931, the Murray-Darling Basin Commission authorised the construction of five barrages. Work commenced in 1935 and was completed in 1940. South Australia's Engineering and Water Supply Department undertook the project, with costs shared equally by the governments of South Australia, Victoria, New South Wales and the Australian government.

=== Marine passage ===
In 2001, the Murray-Darling Basin Commission initiated a program to improve the movement of fish along 2,000 kilometres (1,200 mi) of the River Murray, from the mouth to the Hume Dam. Five fishways were constructed in the Goolwa Barrages in 2002 to allow fish to migrate between saline and freshwater environments. A rock ramp fishway and two vertical slot fishways were constructed at the Tauwitchere Barrage and vertical slot fishways were built at the Goolwa Barrage and Hunters Creek. The fishways also allow freshwater species that inadvertently get washed into the estuary to return to the freshwaters of the lakes.

== Description ==
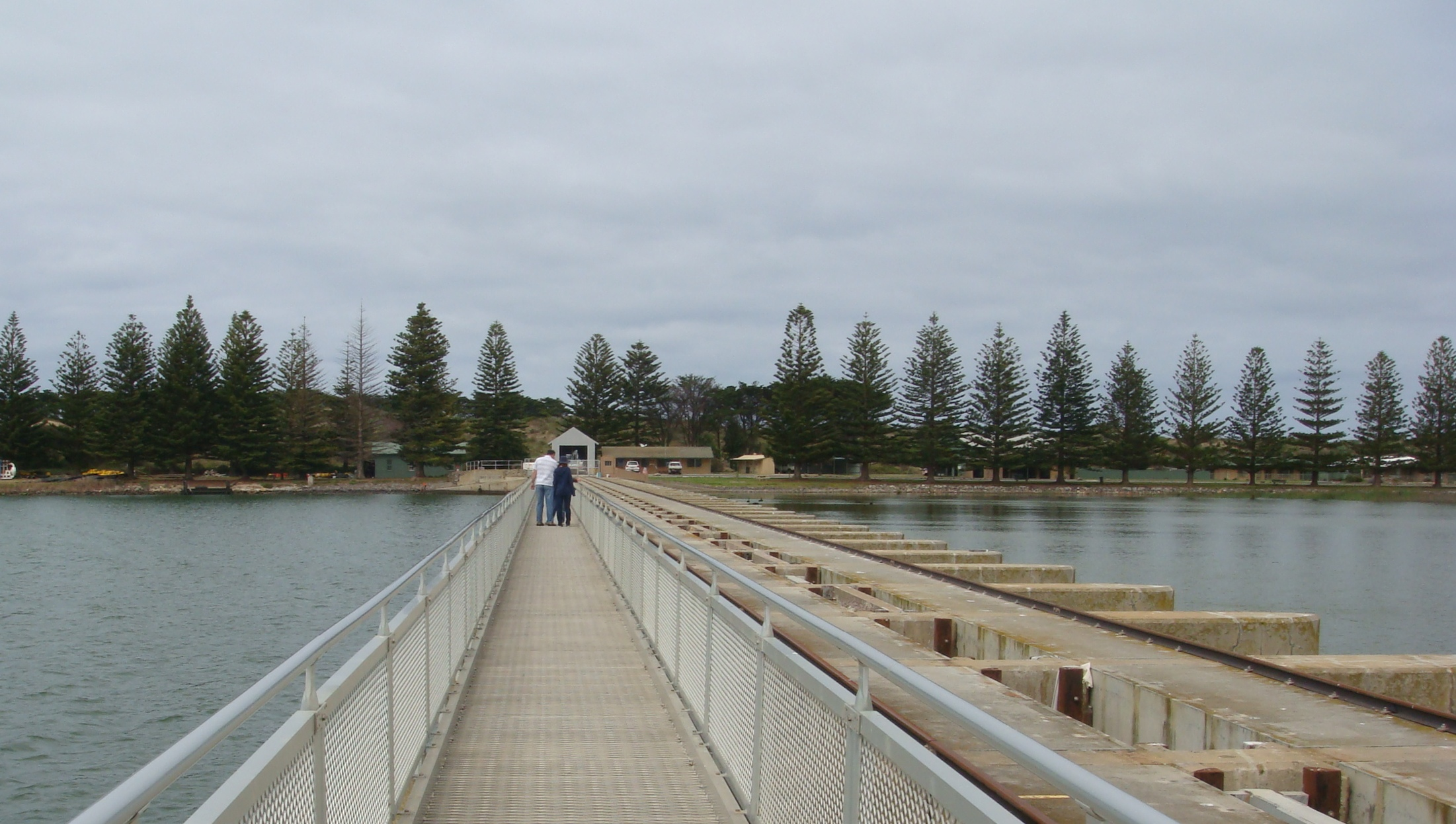
The first Goolwa barrage

The system consists of five barrages extending from Sir Richard Peninsula in the west to Pelican Point on the northern side of the mouth of the Coorong in the east, crossing five channels between the mainland and three islands. From west to east, the five barrages are named Goolwa, Mundoo, Boundary Creek, Ewe Island and Tauwitchere.

Barrage name	Coordinates	Western shore	Eastern shore	Description	Notes
Goolwa	35°31′S 138°48′E	Sir Richard Peninsula	Hindmarsh Island	Includes a lock; measures 30.5 by 6.1 m (100 by 20 ft)	
Mundoo	35°32′S 138°54′E	Hindmarsh Island	Mundoo Island		
Boundary Creek	35°33′S 138°57′E	Mundoo Island	Ewe Island		
Ewe Island	35°33′S 138°58′E	Ewe Island	Tauwitchere Island		
Tauwitchere	35°35′S 139°00′E	Tauwitchere Island	Pelican Point	Includes a lock; measures 13.7 by 3.8 m (45 by 12 ft)	

== Engineering heritage award ==
The barrages are listed as a National Engineering Landmark by Engineers Australia as part of its Engineering Heritage Recognition Program.

== See also ==
- List of reservoirs and dams in South Australia
- List of tidal barrages
