= Kislaya Guba Tidal Power Station =

Tidal power station in the Kislaya Guba, Russia

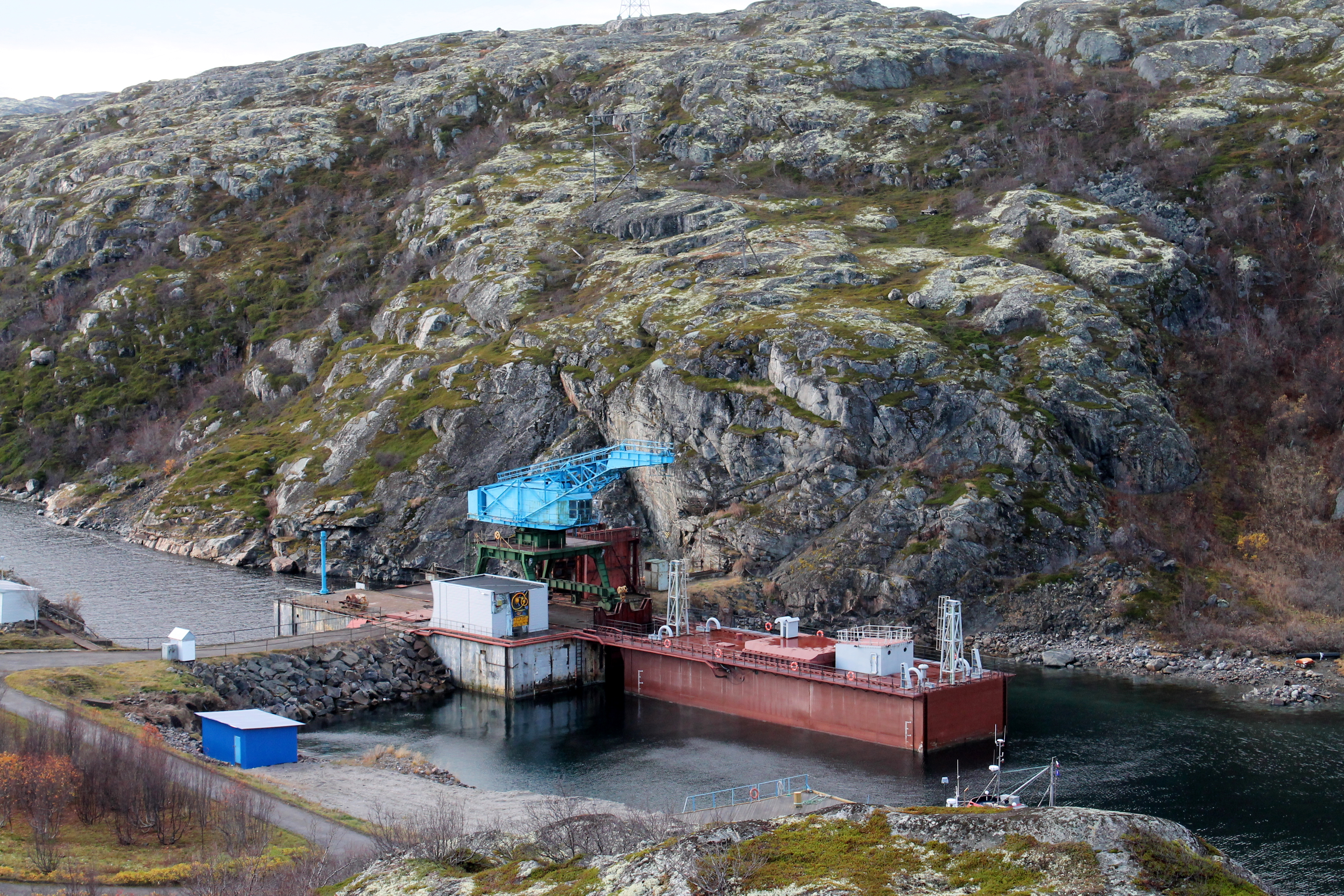
- Country: Russia
- Location: Kislaya Guba
- Coordinates: 69°22′37″N 33°04′33″E
- Status: Operational
- Commission date: 1968
- Owner: RusHydro
- Operator

Tidal power station
- Type: Tidal barrage

Power generation
- Units operational: 1 × 0.2 MW; 1 × 1.5 MW
- Nameplate capacity: 1.7 MW

External links
- Commons: Related media on Commons

The Kislaya Guba Tidal Power Station is an experimental project in Kislaya Guba, Russia.

The station is the world's 4th largest tidal power plant in operation since the Annapolis Royal Generating Station ceased operation. With an output capacity of 1.7 megawatts (2,300 hp). Station began operating in 1968, but was later shut down for 10 years until December 2004, when funding resumed. The old 0.4 megawatts (540 hp) French-built generation unit was dismantled. In 2004 was installed first new 0.2 megawatts (270 hp) generation unit, and in 2007 – second, 1.5 megawatts (2,000 hp). The site was originally chosen because the long and deep fjord had a fairly narrow outlet to the sea which could easily be dammed for the project. There are plans for two larger scale projects based on this design near Mezen, on the White Sea and Tugur on the Sea of Okhotsk.

== See also ==
- List of largest power stations in the world
- List of power stations in Russia
- List of tidal power stations
