= Jiangxia Tidal Power Station =

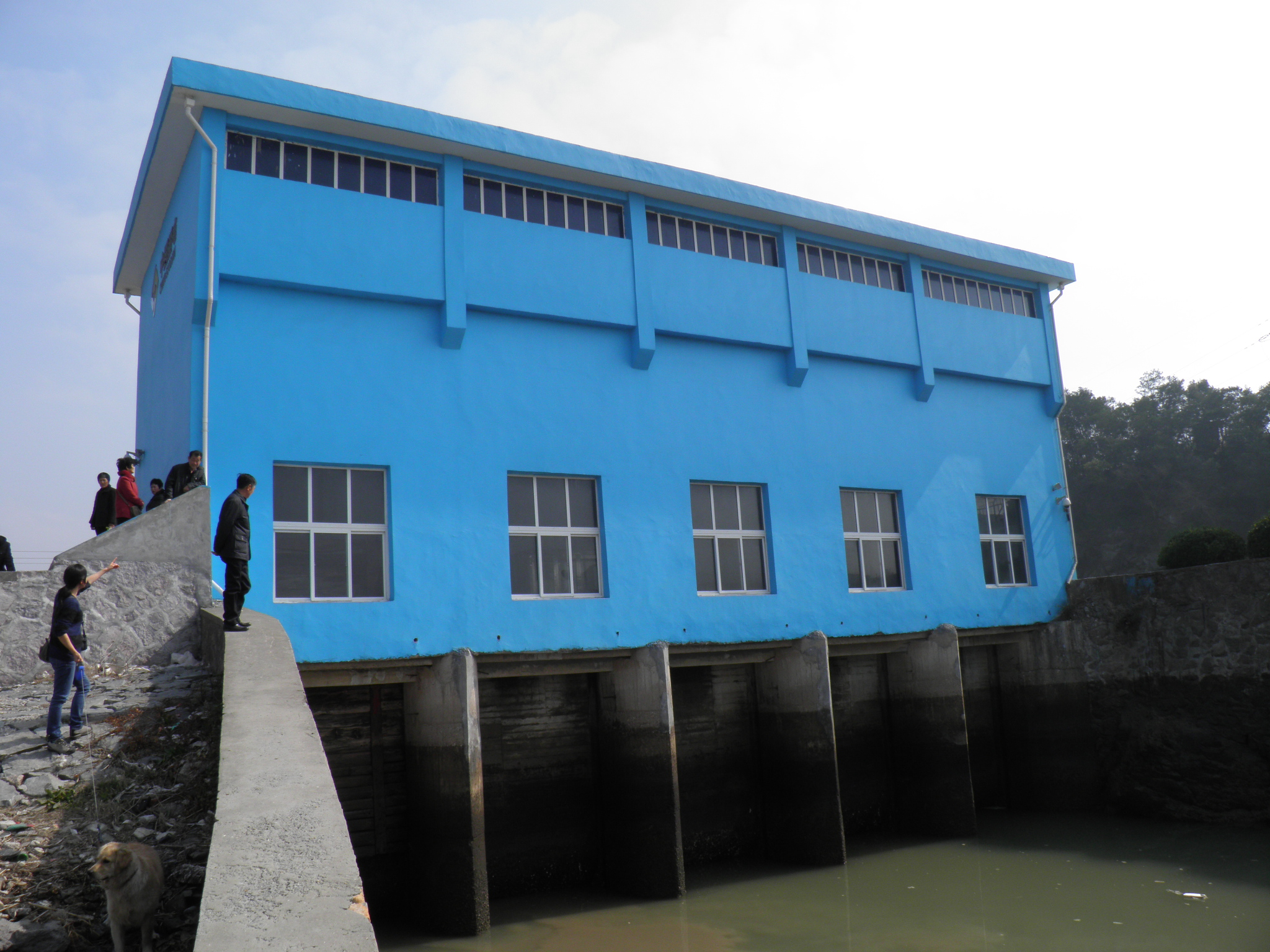

- Location within China
- Country: China
- Location: Wuyantou, Wenling, Zhejiang
- Coordinates: 28°20′34″N 121°14′25″E
- Status: Operational

Dam and spillways
- Type of dam: Barrage

Reservoir
- Tidal range: 8.39 m (27.5 ft)

Power Station
- Commission date: April 1980
- Type: Tidal barrage
- Turbines: 1 × 600 kW; 5 × 700 kW
- Installed capacity: 3.2 MW (previously); 4.1 MW (max. planned)
- Annual generation: 6,500 MWh

The Jiangxia Tidal Power Station (江厦潮汐电站) is the fourth largest tidal power station in the world, located in Wuyantou, Wenling City, Zhejiang Province, China. Although the proposed design for the facility was 3,000 kW, the 1985 the installed capacity was 3,200 kW, generated from one unit of 500 kW, one unit of 600 kW, and three units of 700 kW. Proposals were made to install a sixth 700 kW unit, which was installed in June 2007. Then in 2014, the 500 kW turbine was upgraded to 700 kW, bringing the total installed capacity to 4.1 MW. The facility generates up to 6.5 GWh of power annually.

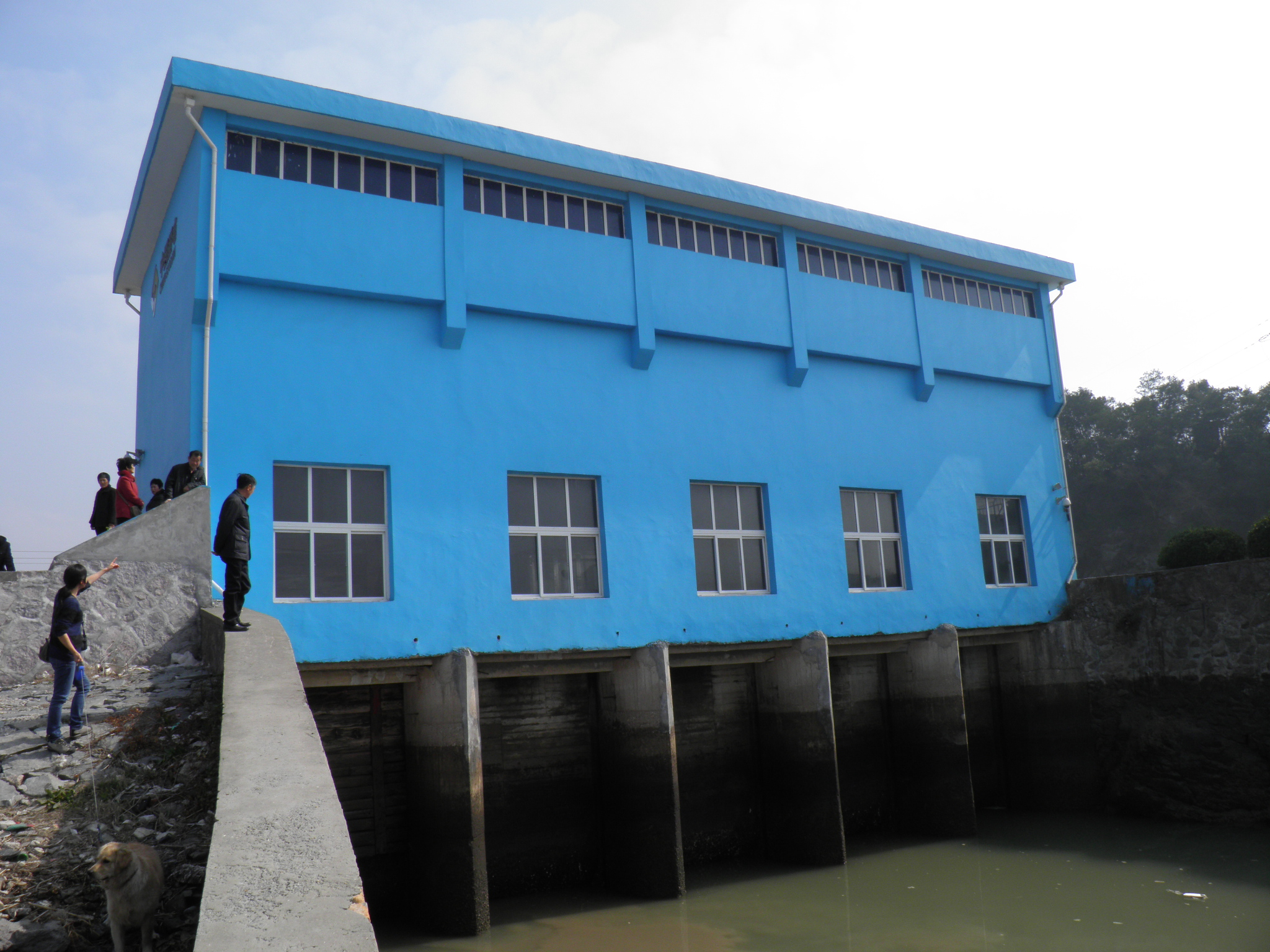
Jiangxia Tidal Power Station

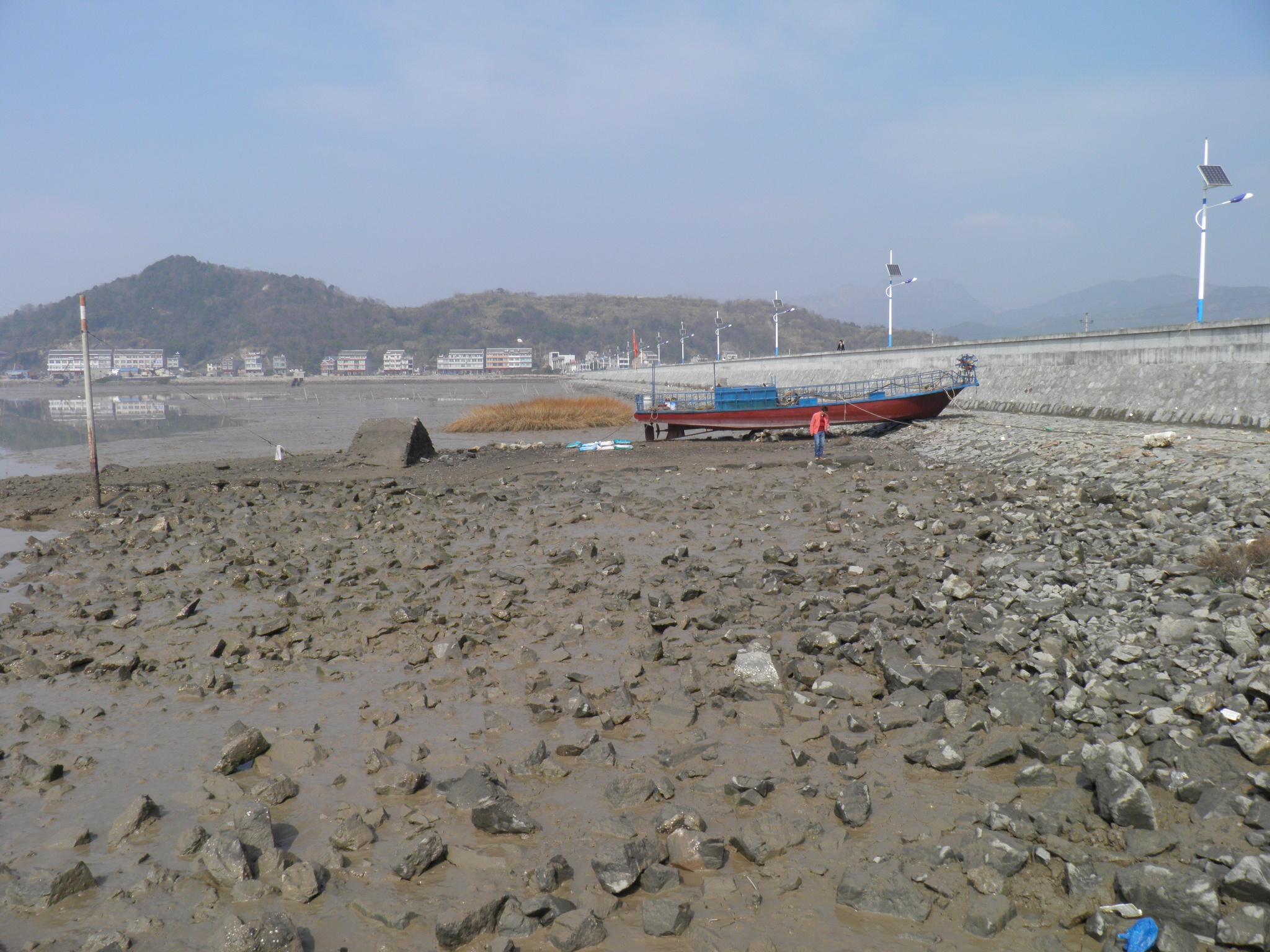
Tidal barrage of the Jiangxia Tidal Power Station

This facility also hosts a 40 kW solar PV power installation with an estimated 45,000 kWh annual production capacity. This system is composed of 216 pieces of 186 W monocrystalline solar modules manufactured by Perlight Solar.

The power station feeds the energy demand of small villages at a 20 km (12 mi) distance, through a 35-kV transmission line. The maximum tidal range in the estuary is 8.39 m (27.5 ft).

Now it is a Major National Historical and Cultural Sites in Zhejiang, it is included on October 16, 2019.

The power generation rate of the site is technically loss-making, however the site is used to provide land reclamation to the area, a combination of aquaculture and shellfish farming provide income to make the scheme as a whole effective, and provide comprehensive use of the reservoir.

== See also ==
- List of largest power stations in the world
- List of power stations in China
- List of tidal power stations
