= Incheon Tidal Power Station =

Proposed structure in South Korea

- Country: South Korea
- Location: Incheon Bay
- Coordinates: 37°29′48″N 126°20′32″E
- Status: Proposed
- Commission date: June 2017
- Construction cost: $3,400 million

Thermal power station
- Primary fuel: Tide
- Turbine technology: Tidal barrage

Power generation
- Units operational: 44 × 30MW
- Nameplate capacity: 1,320 MW
- Annual net output: 2.41 TWh

The Incheon Tidal Power Station is a large tidal power station proposed for Incheon Bay, South Korea. The facility is designed to top 1,320 megawatts (1,770,000 hp) in generating capacity with the help of 44 water turbines rated at 30 megawatts (40,000 hp) each, which would make this facility the largest of its kind in the world. The construction and developments costs are expected to reach ₩3.9 trillion (US$3.4 billion), to be entirely covered by private funding. The station is expected to generate up to 2.41 TWh of energy annually.

Planning for the project was halted in 2012 following environmental concerns. Since then, there has been no news as to when it might proceed or be formally cancelled.

== See also ==
- List of largest power stations in the world
- List of power stations in South Korea
- List of tidal power stations
