= West Somerset Lagoon =

The West Somerset Lagoon is a proposed tidal lagoon on the south side of the Bristol Channel between England and Wales. The intended power generation is 6.5 TWh/year.

A public consultation is underway with a closing date of Easter 2026.
