= Myeongnyang Strait =

Waterway between the South Korean mainland and Jindo Island

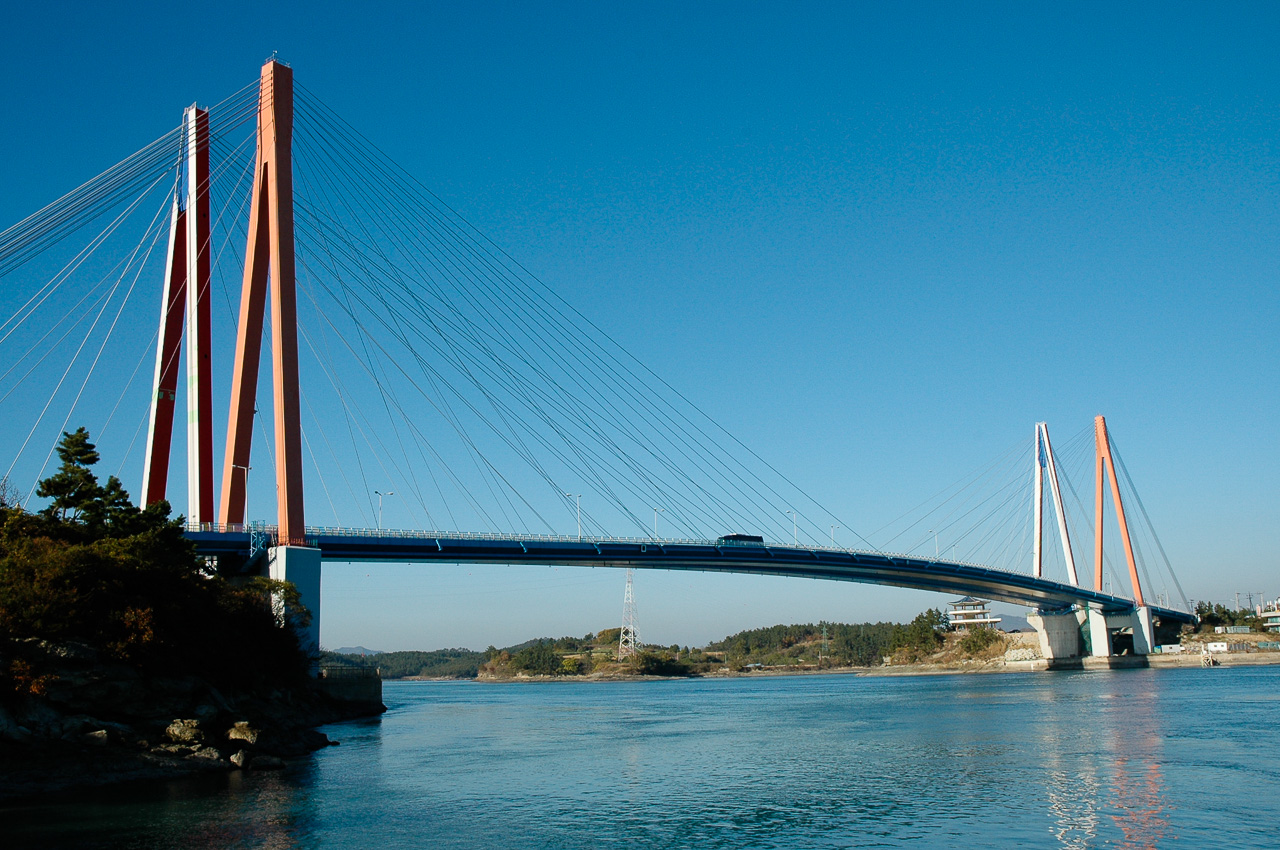
- Jindo Bridge, over the strait (2004)
- Interactive map of Myeongnyang Strait
- Coordinates: 34°34′06″N 126°18′28″E

Korean name
- Hangul: 명량해협
- Hanja: 鳴梁海峽
- RR: Myeongnyang haehyeop
- MR: Myŏngnyang haehyŏp

Myeongnyang Strait (Korean: 명량해협) is a strait separating the mainland of South Korea with the island Jindo. It separates Jindo County and Haenam County, and is located in South Jeolla Province. It is also called Uldolmok (울돌목; lit. 'screaming sea').

== Etymology ==
The strait's original name was the native Korean term Uldolmok, which refers to reported loud sounds made by its rapid currents. When that name is rendered in Hanja (Chinese characters), those characters can be read as "Myeongnyang", hence the current popular name.

== Description ==
The strait is about 293 m (961 ft) wide at the narrowest point. The average width is around 300 m (980 ft). It widens from east to west. At high tide, the water speed reaches 11.5 knots and the depth reaches 19 m (62 ft).

The strait has proved important at several points in Korean history. The seclusion it provided allowed the Sambyeolcho Rebellion to take refuge here in 1271. In 1597, during the Imjin War, the Korean admiral, Yi Sun-sin, achieved a decisive victory in the Battle of Myeongnyang although he was massively outnumbered by the Japanese fleet. Tidal forces mean that the currents of the Myeongnyang Strait reverse direction roughly every three hours.

Jindo Bridge, South Korea's longest cable-stayed bridge, was the first bridge to be constructed over the strait; it was completed in 1984. There is also a memorial to Yi Sun-sin on the coast.

== See also ==
- Geography of South Korea
- History of Korea
- Uldolmok Tidal Power Station
