= List of tidal power stations =

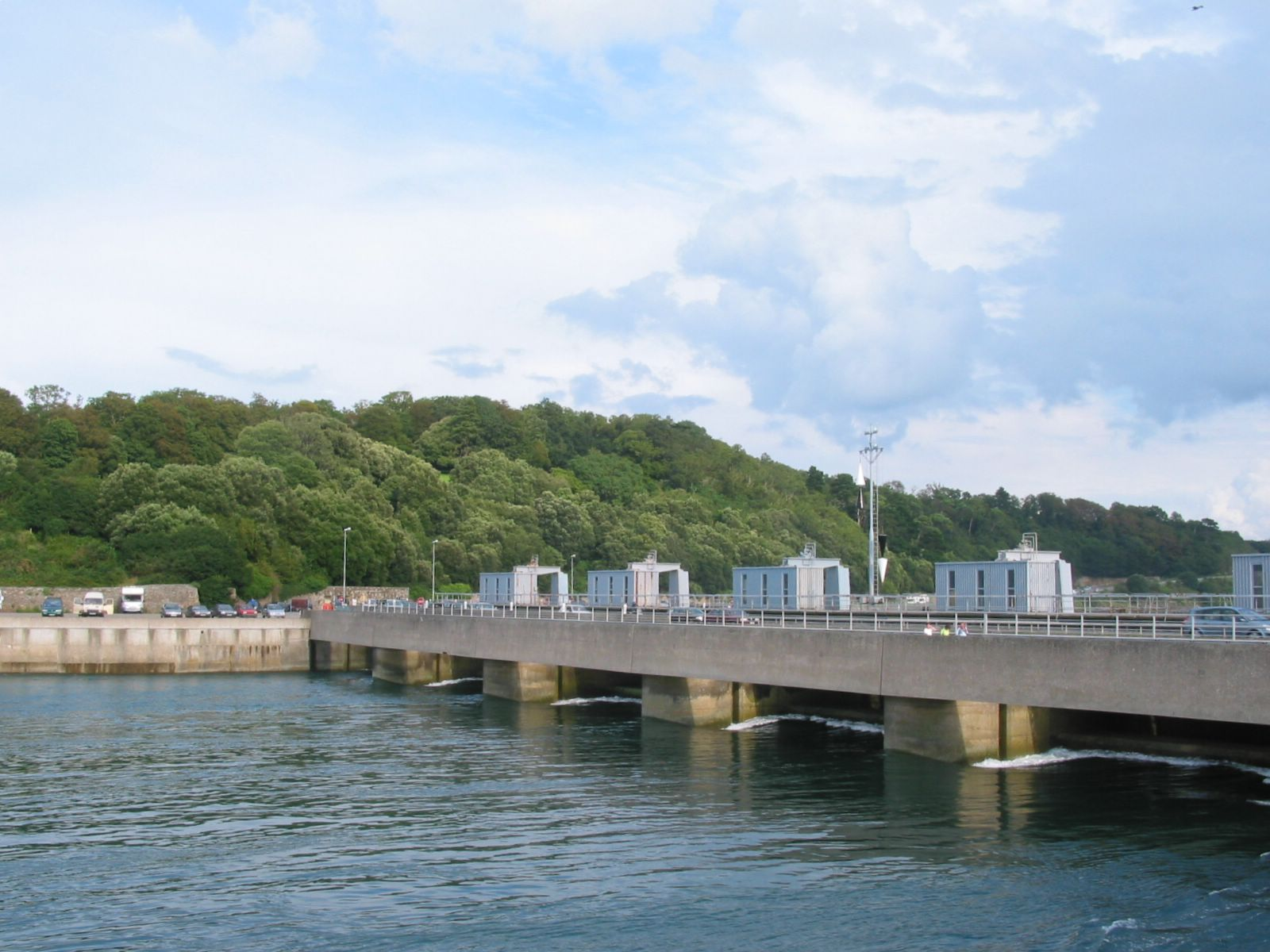
The Rance Tidal Power Station

This article lists most power stations that run on tidal power, both tidal range (impoundment via a barrage) and tidal stream (harnessing currents). Since tidal stream generators are an immature technology, no technology has yet emerged as the clear standard. A large variety of designs are being tested, some very close to large scale deployment. Hence, the following page lists stations of different technologies. While only a few schemes are operational or under construction, many more have been proposed, but some of these plans may never be constructed.

== Tidal power stations ==
=== Operational ===
The following table lists tidal power stations that are in operation:

| Station | Capacity (MW) | Turbines | Country | Location | Comm | Ref |
|---|---|---|---|---|---|---|
| Bluemull Sound Tidal Stream Array | 0.3 | 3 × 100 kW Nova Innovation M100D | United Kingdom | 60°41′01″N 00°59′12″W | 2016 | |
| EMEC Fall of Warness tidal test site | 7 to 10 | 1 × 2 MW Orbital O2 1 × Magallanes Renovables ATIR | United Kingdom | 59°9′7.92″N 2°49′2.28″W | 2007 | |
| Haishan Tidal Power Plant | 0.25 | | China | 28°13′52″N 121°9′22″E | 1975 | |
| Jiangxia Tidal Power Station | 4.1 | 1 × 600 kW, 5 × 700 kW | China | 28°20′34″N 121°14′25″E | 1980 | |
| Kislaya Guba Tidal Power Station | 1.7 | | Russia | 69°22′37″N 33°04′33″E | 1968 | |
| LHD Tidal Current Energy Demonstration Project | 1.7 | | China | 30°8′15.48″N 122°10′1.25″E | | |
| MeyGen | 6 | 4 × 1.5 MW | United Kingdom; Scotland | 58°39′26.15″N 3°7′1.55″W | 2017 | |
| Minesto Vestmannasund | 1.4 | 1 × 1.2 MW, 2 × 100 kW tidal kites | Faroe Islands | 53°17′49.8″N 4°47′57.3″W | 2022, 2024 | |
| Rance Tidal Power Station | 240 | 24 × 10 MW reversible Kaplan turbines | France | 48°37′05″N 02°01′24″W | 1966 renovated 2011 | |
| Sihwa Lake Tidal Power Station | 254 | 10 × 25.4 MW bulb turbines | South Korea | 37°18′47″N 126°36′46″E | 2011 | |
| Uldolmok Tidal Power Station | 1.5 | | South Korea | 34°32′07″N 126°14′06″E | 2009 | |

=== Under construction ===
The following table lists tidal power stations that are currently under construction as of the date in each cited source.

| Station | Capacity (MW) | Country | Location | Start | Ref |
|---|---|---|---|---|---|
| Morlais (West Anglesey Demonstration Zone) | 240 MW potential | United Kingdom; Wales | 53°18′23″N 4°43′00″W | Consented 2021; 1st tidal device 2026 | |

=== Proposed ===
The following table lists tidal power stations that are at a proposal stage. Some of these scheme may not go ahead, but have not formally been cancelled.

| Station | Capacity (MW) | Turbines | Country | Location | Ref |
|---|---|---|---|---|---|
| EURO-TIDES project | 9.6 | 4 × Orbital O2 (tbc) | United Kingdom | Fall of Warness, Orkney | |
| FloWatt tidal power project | 17.5 | 7 × HydroQuest HQ2.5 | France | Raz Blanchard | |
| Garorim Bay Tidal Power Station | 520 | | South Korea | Garorim Bay | |
| Gulf of Kutch Project | 50 | | India | Gulf of Kutch | |
| Incheon Tidal Power Station | 818 or 1,320 | | South Korea | 37°29′48″N 126°20′32″E | |
| Mersey Tidal Power | 1,000 | | United Kingdom | River Mersey | |
| Mezenskaya Tidal Power Plant | 24,000 | | Russia | Mezen Bay | |
| Normandie Hydroliennes NH1 | 12 | 3 × Proteus Marine Renewables AR3000 | France | Raz Blanchard | |
| Penzhin Tidal Power Plant Project | 89,100 | | Russia | Penzhin Bay | |
| Seastar project | 4 | 16 × 250 kW Nova Innovation | United Kingdom | Fall of Warness, Orkney | |
| Severn Barrage | 8,640 | | United Kingdom | 51°21′30″N 03°06′00″W | |
| Tidal Lagoon Swansea Bay | 320 | | United Kingdom | Swansea Bay | |
| Tugurskaya Tidal Power Plant | 3,640 | | Russia | Okhotsk Sea | |
| Westray Firth | 30 | Orbital marine power | United Kingdom | Westray Firth, Orkney | |
| Yell Sound | 15 | Nova Innovation | United Kingdom | Yell Sound, Shetland | |

==== Historical proposals ====
These schemes were proposed, but will not now go ahead in the form originally proposed because the developer has ceased trading, the technology is no longer being developed, or the consent has lapsed.

| Station | Capacity (MW) | Country | Location | Status | Ref |
|---|---|---|---|---|---|
| Alderney tidal plant | 400 | Guernsey | 49°42′52″N 2°12′19″W | OpenHydro ceased trading | |
| Kaipara Tidal Power Station | 200 | NZ | 36°25′S 174°10′E | Project paused in 2013 and consent lapsed in 2021 | |
| Pempa’q In-Stream Tidal Energy Project | 1.26 | Canada | 45°20′36″N 64°23′34″W | Development halted following permitting issues | |
| Skerries Tidal Stream Array | 10.5 | United Kingdom | 53°26′N 04°36′W approx. | MCT device no longer being developed | |

=== Decommissioned ===
| Station | Capacity (MW) | Country | Location | Years | Ref |
|---|---|---|---|---|---|
| Annapolis Royal Generating Station | 20 | Canada | 44°45′07″N 65°30′40″W | 1984-2019 | |
| Eastern Scheldt Barrier Tidal Power Plant | 1.25 (5×0.25) | The Netherlands | 51°36′19″N 03°40′59″E | 2015-2023 | |
| Minas Passage OpenHydro | 2 | Canada | Minas Passage | 2016-2018 | |
| Strangford Lough SeaGen | 1.2 | United Kingdom | 54°22′04″N 05°32′40″W | 2008-2019 | |

== See also ==
- Tidal power
- Development of tidal stream generators
- List of largest power stations in the world
- List of hydroelectric power station failures
