= Tidal barrage =

Dam-like structure

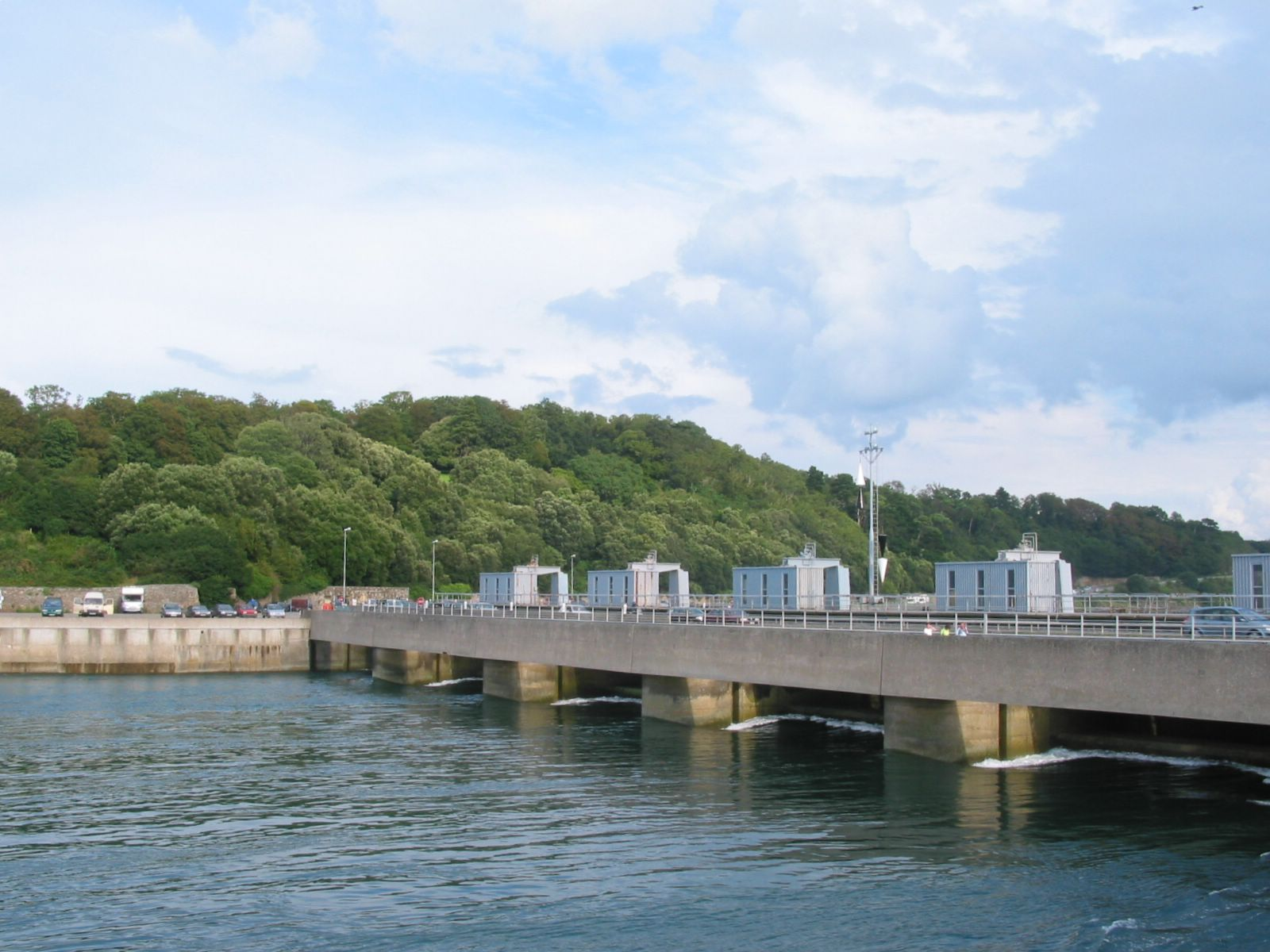
The Rance Tidal Power Station, a tidal barrage in France

A tidal barrage is a dam-like structure used to capture the energy from masses of water moving in and out of a bay or river due to tidal forces.

Instead of damming water on one side like a conventional dam, a tidal barrage allows water to flow into a bay or river during high tide, and releases the water during low tide. This is done by measuring the tidal flow and controlling the sluice gates at key times of the tidal cycle. Turbines are placed at these sluices to capture the energy as the water flows in and out.

Tidal barrages are among the oldest methods of tidal power generation, with tide mills being developed as early as the sixth century. In the 1960s the 1.7 megawatt Kislaya Guba Tidal Power Station in Kislaya Guba, Russia, was built. Around the same time, the 240 MW la Rance Tidal Power Station was built in Brittany, France, opened in November 1966. La Rance was the largest tidal barrage in world for 45 years, until the 254 MW Sihwa Lake Tidal Power Station was commissioned in South Korea in 2011. However, there are few other examples worldwide.

== Generating methods ==
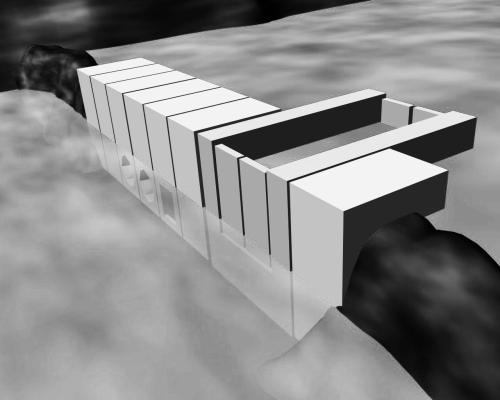
An artistic impression of a tidal barrage, including embankments, a ship lock, and caissons housing a sluice and two turbines

The barrage method of extracting tidal energy involves building a barrage across a bay or river that is subject to tidal flow. Turbines installed in the barrage wall generate power as water flows in and out of the estuary basin, bay, or river. These systems are similar to a hydro dam that produces static head or pressure head (a height of water pressure). When the water level outside of the basin or lagoon changes relative to the water level inside, the turbines are able to produce power.

The basic elements of a barrage are caissons, embankments, sluices, turbines, and ship locks. Sluices, turbines, and ship locks are housed in caissons (very large concrete blocks). Embankments seal a basin where it is not sealed by caissons. The sluice gates applicable to tidal power are the flap gate, vertical rising gate, radial gate, and rising sector.

Only a few such plants exist. The first was the Rance Tidal Power Station, on the Rance river, in France, which has been operating since 1966 and generates 240MW. A larger 254MW plant began operation at Sihwa Lake, Korea, in 2011. Smaller plants include the Annapolis Royal Generating Station on the Bay of Fundy, and another across a tiny inlet in Kislaya Guba, Russia. A number of proposals have been considered for a barrage across the River Severn, from Brean Down in England to Lavernock Point near Cardiff in Wales.

Barrage systems are dependent on high civil infrastructure costs associated with what is in effect a dam being placed across estuarine systems. As people have become more aware of environmental issues, they have opposed barrages because of the adverse effects associated with changing a large ecosystem that is habitat for many varieties of species.

=== Ebb generation ===
The basin is filled through the sluices until high tide. Then the sluice gates are closed. (At this stage there may be "Pumping" to raise the level further). The turbine gates are kept closed until the sea level falls, in order to create sufficient head across the barrage. The gates are opened so that the turbines generate until the head is again low. Then the sluices are opened, turbines disconnected and the basin is filled again. The cycle repeats with the tides. Ebb generation (also known as outflow generation) takes its name because generation occurs as the tide changes tidal direction.

=== Flood generation ===
The basin is filled through the turbines, which generate at tide flood. This is generally much less efficient than ebb generation, because the volume contained in the upper half of the basin (which is where ebb generation operates) is greater than the volume of the lower half (filled first during flood generation). Therefore, the available level difference – important for the turbine power produced – between the basin side and the sea side of the barrage, reduces more quickly than it would in ebb generation. Rivers flowing into the basin may further reduce the energy potential, instead of enhancing it as in ebb generation. Of course this is not a problem with the "lagoon" model, without river inflow.

=== Pumping ===
Turbines are able to be powered in reverse by excess energy in the grid to increase the water level in the basin at high tide (for ebb generation). Much of this energy is returned during generation, because power output is strongly related to the head. If water is raised 2 ft (61 cm) by pumping on a high tide of 10 ft (3 m), this will have been raised by 12 ft (3.7 m) at low tide.

=== Two-basin schemes ===
Another form of energy barrage configuration is that of the dual basin type. With two basins, one is filled at high tide and the other is emptied at low tide. Turbines are placed between the basins. Two-basin schemes offer advantages over normal schemes in that generation time can be adjusted with high flexibility and it is also possible to generate almost continuously. In normal estuarine situations, however, two-basin schemes are very expensive to construct due to the cost of the extra length of barrage. There are some favourable geographies, however, which are well suited to this type of scheme.

=== Tidal lagoon power ===
Tidal pools are independent enclosing barrages built on high level tidal estuary land that trap the high water and release it to generate power, single pool, around 3.3 W/m^{2}. Two lagoons operating at different time intervals can guarantee continuous power output, around 4.5 W/m^{2}. Enhanced pumped storage tidal series of lagoons raises the water level higher than the high tide, and uses intermittent renewables for pumping, around 7.5 W/m^{2}. i.e. 10 × 10 km^{2} delivers 750 MW constant output 24/7. These independent barrages do not block the flow of the river.

== Environmental impact ==
The placement of a barrage into an estuary has a considerable effect on the water inside the basin and on the ecosystem. Many governments have been reluctant in recent times to grant approval for tidal barrages. Through research conducted on tidal plants, it has been found that tidal barrages constructed at the mouths of estuaries pose similar environmental threats as large dams. The construction of large tidal plants alters the flow of saltwater in and out of estuaries, which changes the hydrology and salinity and could possibly harm marine mammals that use the estuaries as their habitat. The La Rance plant, off the Brittany coast of northern France, was the first and largest tidal barrage plant in the world. It is also the only site where a full-scale evaluation of the ecological impact of a tidal power system, operating for 20 years, has been made.

French researchers found that the isolation of the estuary during the construction phases of the tidal barrage was detrimental to flora and fauna, however; after ten years, there has been a "variable degree of biological adjustment to the new environmental conditions."

Some species lost their habitat due to La Rance's construction, but other species colonized the abandoned space, which caused a shift in diversity. Also as a result of the construction, sandbanks disappeared, the beach of St. Servan was badly damaged and high-speed currents have developed near sluices, which are water channels controlled by gates.

=== Turbidity ===
Turbidity (the amount of matter in suspension in the water) decreases as a result of smaller volume of water being exchanged between the basin and the sea. This lets light from the Sun penetrate the water further, improving conditions for the phytoplankton. The changes propagate up the food chain, causing a general change in the ecosystem.

=== Tidal fences and turbines ===
Tidal fences and turbines, if constructed properly, pose less environmental threats than tidal barrages. Tidal fences and turbines, like tidal stream generators, rely entirely on the kinetic motion of the tidal currents and do not use dams or barrages to block channels or estuarine mouths. Unlike barrages, tidal fences do not interrupt fish migration or alter hydrology, thus these options offer energy generating capacity without dire environmental impacts. Tidal fences and turbines can have varying environmental impacts depending on whether or not fences and turbines are constructed with regard to the environment. The main environmental impact of turbines is their impact on fish. If the turbines are moving slowly enough, such as low velocities of 25–50 rpm, fish kill is minimalized and silt and other nutrients are able to flow through the structures. For example, a 20 kW tidal turbine prototype built in the St. Lawrence Seaway in 1983 reported no fish kills. Tidal fences block off channels, which makes it difficult for fish and wildlife to migrate through those channels. In order to reduce fish kill, fences could be engineered so that the spaces between the caisson wall and the rotor foil are large enough to allow fish to pass through. Larger marine mammals such as seals or dolphins can be protected from the turbines by fences or a sonar sensor auto-braking system that automatically shuts the turbines down when marine mammals are detected.

=== Salinity ===
As a result of less water exchange with the sea, the average salinity inside the basin decreases, also affecting the ecosystem. "Tidal Lagoons" do not suffer from this problem.

=== Sediment movements ===
Estuaries often have high volume of sediments moving through them, from the rivers to the sea. The introduction of a barrage into an estuary may result in sediment accumulation within the barrage, affecting the ecosystem and also the operation of the barrage.

=== Fish ===
Fish may move through sluices safely, but when these are closed, fish will seek out turbines and attempt to swim through them. Also, some fish will be unable to escape the water speed near a turbine and will be sucked through. Even with the most fish-friendly turbine design, fish mortality per pass is approximately 15% (from pressure drop, contact with blades, cavitation, etc.). Alternative passage technologies (fish ladders, fish lifts, fish escalators etc.) have so far failed to solve this problem for tidal barrages, either offering extremely expensive solutions, or ones which are used by a small fraction of fish only. Research in sonic guidance of fish is ongoing. The Open-Centre turbine reduces this problem allowing fish to pass through the open centre of the turbine.

Recently a run of the river type turbine has been developed in France. This is a very large slow rotating Kaplan-type turbine mounted on an angle. Testing for fish mortality has indicated fish mortality figures to be less than 5%. This concept also seems very suitable for adaption to marine current/tidal turbines.

== Energy calculations ==
The energy available from a barrage is dependent on the volume of water. The potential energy contained in a volume of water is:

$$E\, =\, \tfrac12\, A\, \rho\, g\, h^2$$

where:

- h is the vertical tidal range,
- A is the horizontal area of the barrage basin,
- ρ is the density of water = 1025 kg per cubic meter (seawater varies between 1021 and 1030 kg per cubic meter) and
- g is the acceleration due to the Earth's gravity = 9.81 meters per second squared.

The factor half is due to the fact, that as the basin flows empty through the turbines, the hydraulic head over the dam reduces. The maximum head is only available at the moment of low water, assuming the high water level is still present in the basin.

=== Example calculation of tidal power generation ===
Assumptions:

- The tidal range of tide at a particular place is 32 feet = 10 m (approx)
- The surface of the tidal energy harnessing plant is 9 km^{2} (3 km × 3 km)= 3000 m × 3000 m = 9 million m^{2}
- Density of sea water = 1025.18 kg/m^{3}

Mass of the sea water = volume of sea water × density of sea water

= (area × tidal range) of water × mass density
= (9 million m^{2} × 10 m) × 1025.18 kg/m^{3}
= 92 billion kg (approx)

Potential energy content of the water in the basin at high tide = ½ × area × density × gravitational acceleration × tidal range squared

= ½ × 9 million m^{2} × 1025 kg/m^{3} × 9.81 m/s^{2} × (10 m)^{2}
=4.5 trillion J (approx)

Now we have 2 high tides and 2 low tides every day. At low tide the potential energy is zero.
Therefore, the total energy potential per day = Energy for a single high tide × 2

= 4.5 trillion J × 2
= 9 trillion J

Therefore, the mean power generation potential = Energy generation potential / time in 1 day

= 9 trillion J / 86400 s
= 104 MW

Assuming the power conversion efficiency to be 30%: The daily-average power generated = 104 MW * 30%

= 31 MW (approx)

Because the available power varies with the square of the tidal range, a barrage is best placed in a location with very high-amplitude tides. Suitable locations are found in Russia, the US, Canada, Australia, Korea, and the UK. Amplitudes of up to 17 m (56 ft) occur for example in the Bay of Fundy, where tidal resonance amplifies the tidal range.

== Economics ==
Tidal barrage power schemes have a high capital cost and a very low running cost. As a result, a tidal power scheme may not produce returns for many years, and investors may be reluctant to participate in such projects.

It reportedly took around 20 years to recoup the $100m costs of building the Rance Tidal Power Plant. As of 2024, it has been operating for 60 years with the cost of tidal power lower than nuclear or solar, so it has more than paid back the construction costs.

Governments may be able to finance tidal barrage power, but many are unwilling to do so also due to the lag time before investment return and the high irreversible commitment. For example, the energy policy of the United Kingdom recognizes the role of tidal energy and expresses the need for local councils to understand the broader national goals of renewable energy in approving tidal projects. The UK government itself appreciates the technical viability and siting options available, but has failed to provide meaningful incentives to move these goals forward.

== See also ==
- List of tidal barrages
- List of tidal power stations
- Marine energy
- Tethys, a database on potential environmental effects of marine and hydrokinetic and offshore wind energy development
