= Rance Tidal Power Station =

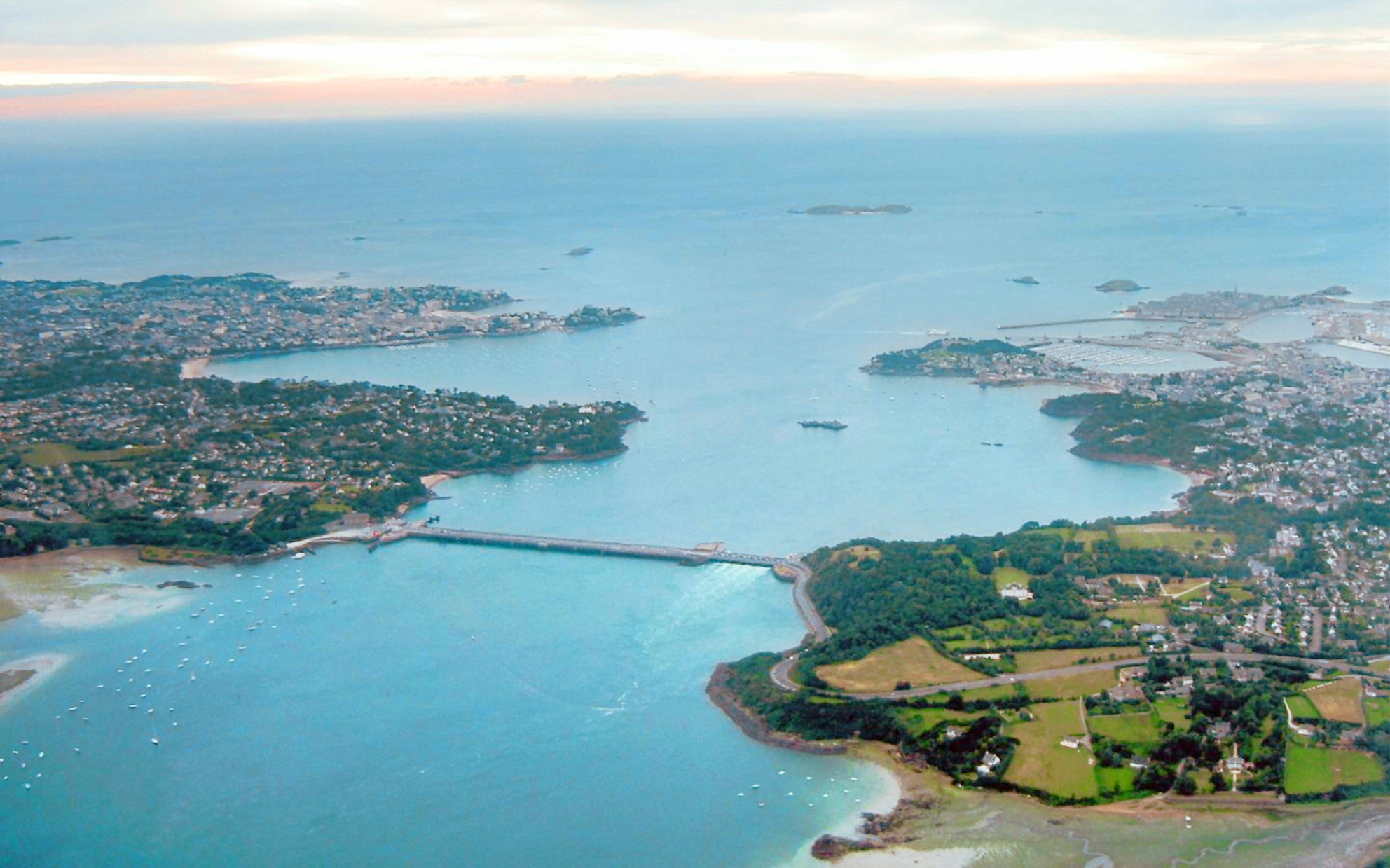
- Aerial photograph of the Rance Tidal Power Station

- Location within France
- Official name: Usine marémotrice de la Rance
- Country: France
- Location: Brittany
- Coordinates: 48°37′05″N 02°01′24″W
- Status: Operational
- Construction began: 26 July 1963
- Opening date: 26 November 1966
- Construction cost: ₣620 million
- Owner: Électricité de France

Dam and spillways
- Type of dam: Barrage
- Length: 700 m (2,300 ft)

Reservoir
- Tidal range: 8 m (26 ft)

Power Station
- Type: Tidal barrage
- Turbines: 24
- Installed capacity: 240 MW
- Capacity factor: 24%
- Annual generation: 500 GWh

The Rance Tidal Power Station is a tidal power station located on the estuary of the Rance River in Brittany, France.

Opened in 1966 as the world's first tidal power station, the 240-megawatt (MW) facility was the largest such power station in the world by installed capacity for 45 years until the 254-MW South Korean Sihwa Lake Tidal Power Station surpassed it in 2011.

== Characteristics ==
The power station has 24 turbines. These reach total peak output at 240 MW, and produce an annual output of approximately 500 GWh (2023: 506 GWh; 491 GWh in 2009, 523 GWh in 2010); thus the average output is approximately 57 MW, and the capacity factor is approximately 24%.

The turbines are "bulb" Kaplan turbines, of nominal power 10 MW; their diameter is 5.35 m, each has 4 blades, their nominal rotation speed is 93.75 rpm and their maximal speed 240 rpm. Half of the turbines were built from martensitic stainless steel, the other half from aluminium bronze. The plant is equipped with cathodic protection against corrosion.

It supplies 0.12% of the power demand of France. The power density is of the order of 2.6 kW/m^{2}. The cost of electricity production is estimated at 0.12€/kWh.

The barrage is 750 m (2,461 ft) long, from Brebis point in the west to Briantais point in the east. The power plant portion of the dam is 332.5 m (1,091 ft) long and the tidal basin measures 22.5 km^{2} (9 sq mi).

== History ==
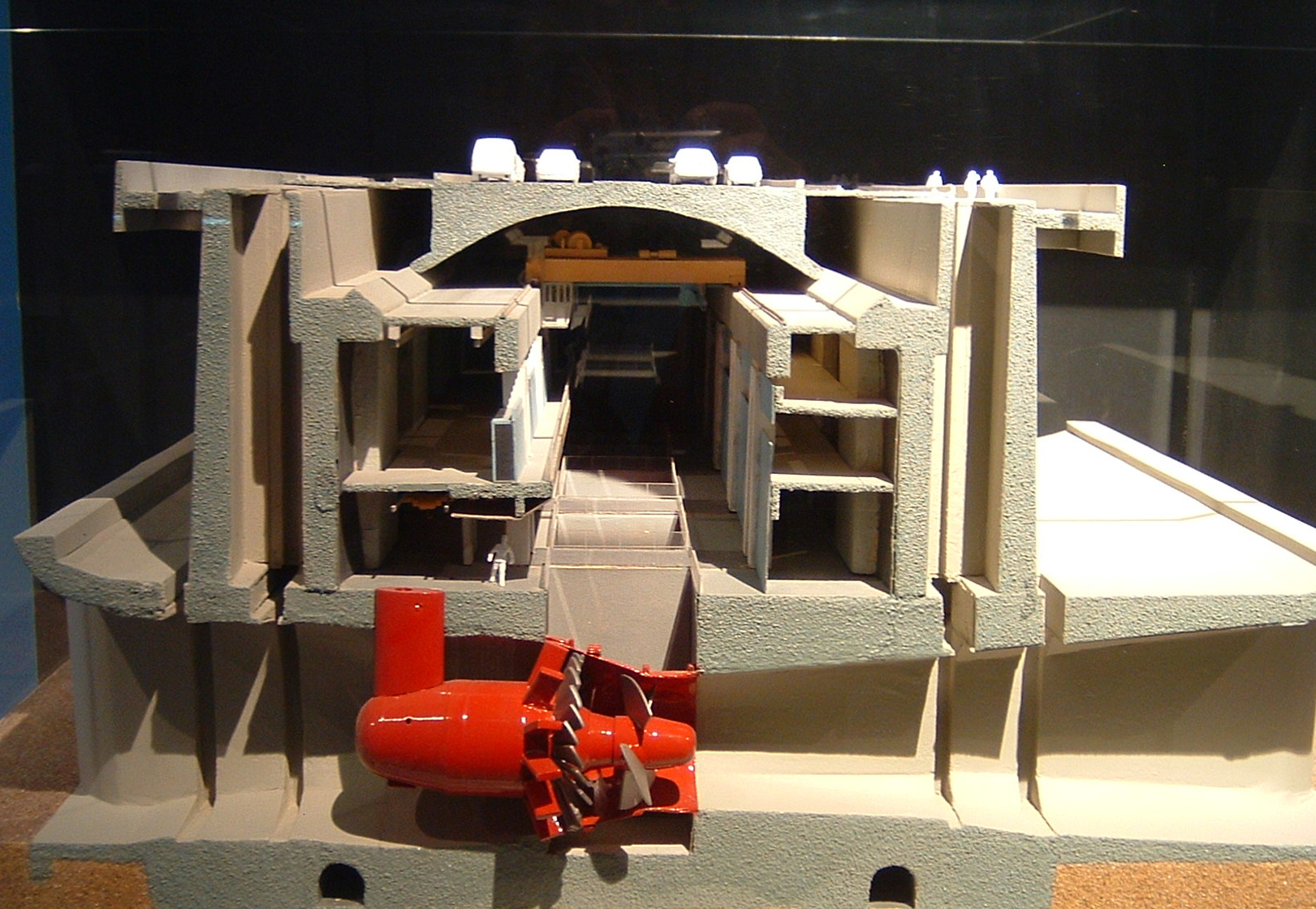
Scale model of the power station

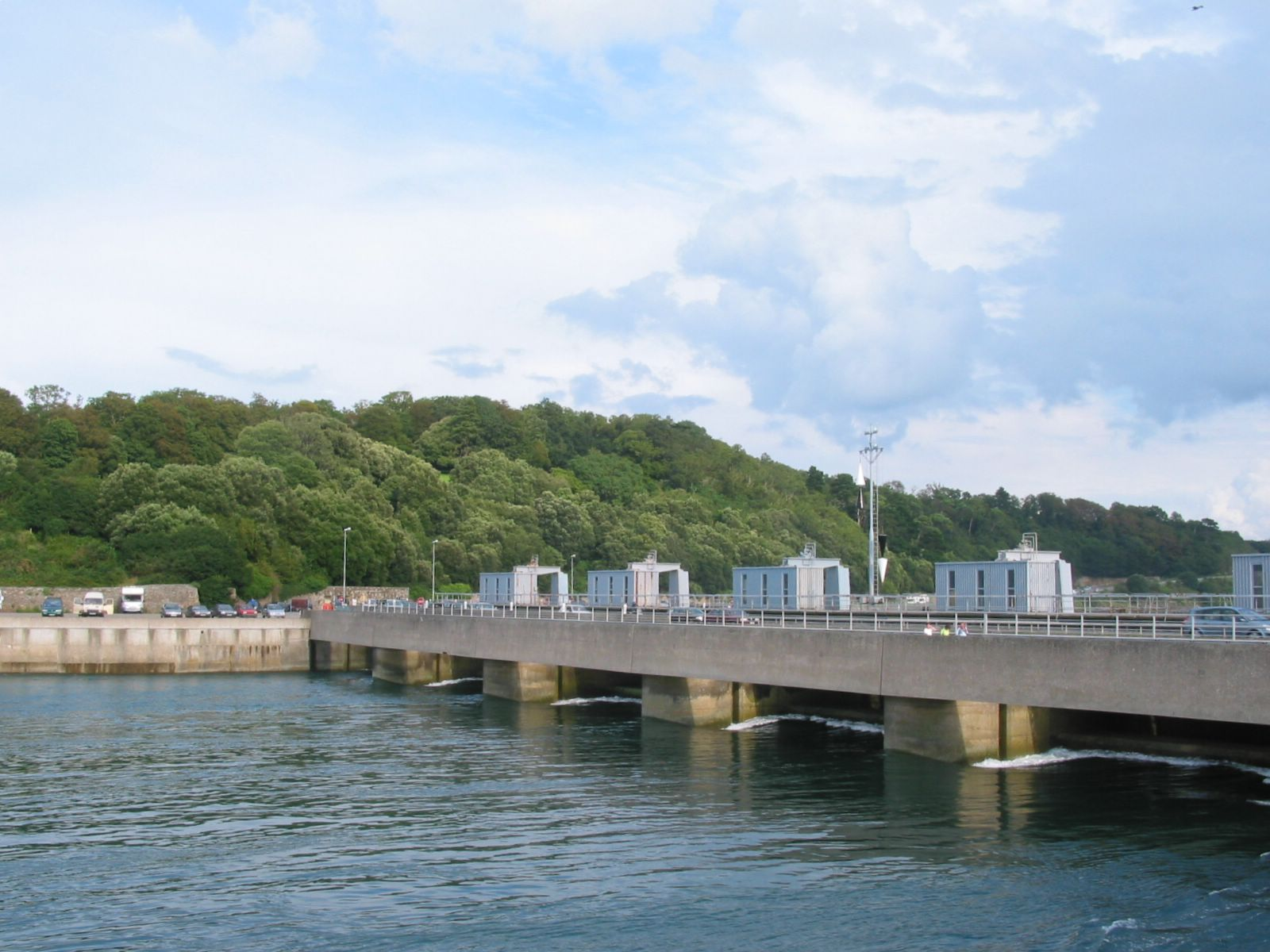
The power plant

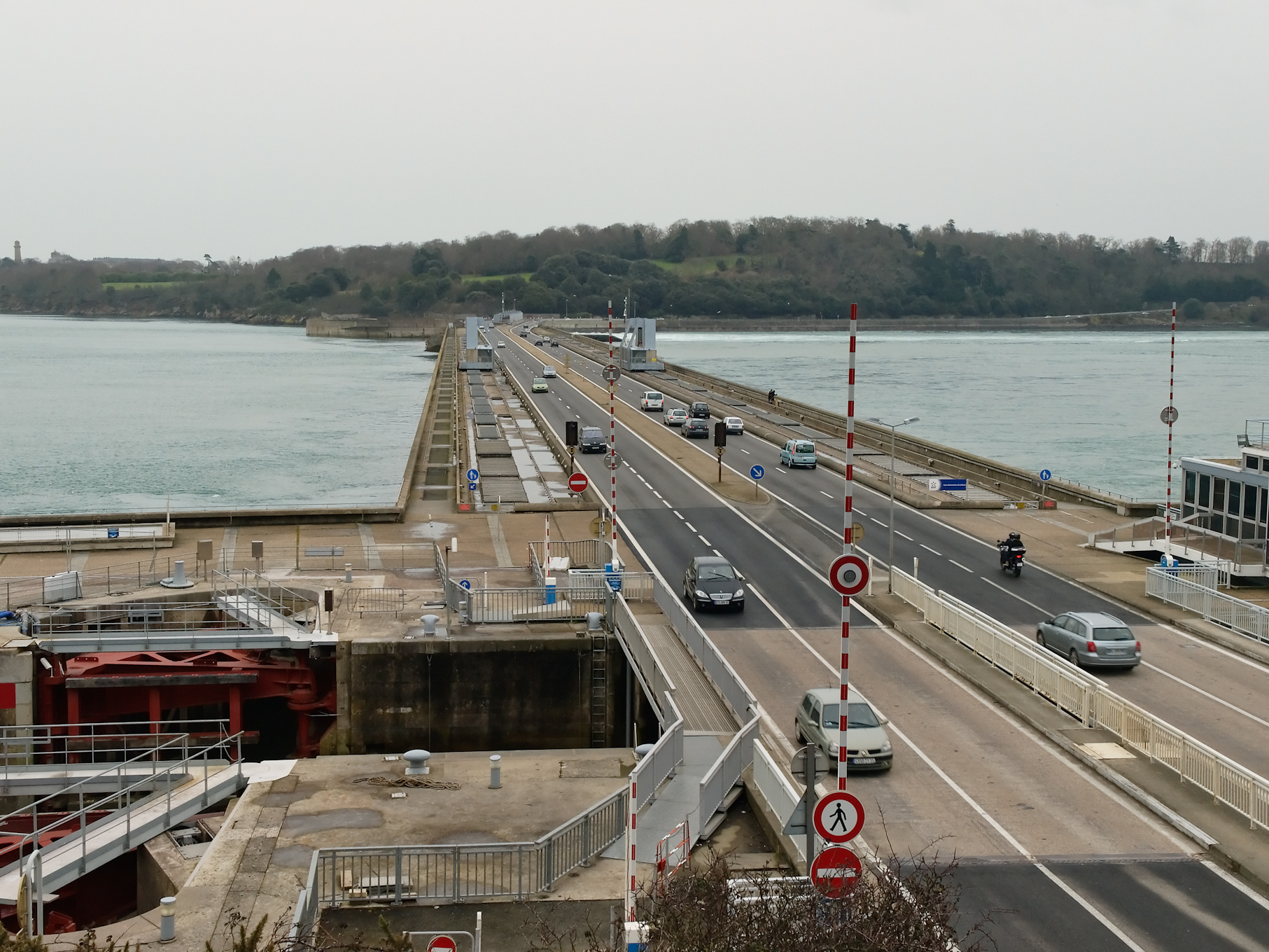
The road on the power station

Video Rance Tidal Power Station

An early attempt to build a tidal power plant was made at Aber Wrac'h in the Finistère in 1925, but due to insufficient finance, it was abandoned in 1930. Plans for this plant served as the draft for follow-on work. Use of tidal energy is not an entirely new concept, since tidal mills have long existed in areas exposed to tides, particularly along the Rance.

The idea of constructing a tidal power plant on the Rance dates to Gerard Boisnoer in 1921. The site was attractive because of the wide average-range between low and high tide levels, 8 m (26.2 ft) with a maximum perigean spring tide range of 13.5 m (44.3 ft). The first studies which envisaged a tidal plant on the Rance were done by the Society for the Study of Utilization of the Tides in 1943. Nevertheless, work did not actually commence until 1961. Albert Caquot, the visionary engineer, was instrumental in the construction of the dam, designing an enclosure in order to protect the construction site from the ocean tides and the strong streams. Construction necessitated draining the area where the plant was to be built, which required construction of two dams which took two years. Construction of the plant commenced on 20 July 1963, while the Rance was entirely blocked by the two dams.

Construction took three years and was completed in 1966. Charles de Gaulle, then President of France, inaugurated the plant on 26 November of the same year. Inauguration of the road crossing the plant took place on 1 July 1967, and connection of the plant to the French National Power Grid was carried out on 4 December 1967. In total, the plant cost ₣620 million (approximately €94.5 million). It took almost 20 years for the La Rance to pay for itself.

== Assessments ==
In spite of the high development cost of the project, the costs have now been recovered, and electricity production costs are lower than that of nuclear power generation (1.8 ¢/kWh versus 2.5 ¢/kWh for nuclear). However, the capacity factor of the plant is 28%, lower than 85–90% for nuclear power.

=== Environmental impact ===
The barrage has caused progressive silting of the Rance ecosystem. Sand-eels and plaice have disappeared, though sea bass and cuttlefish have returned to the river. By definition, tides still flow in the estuary and the operator, EDF, endeavours to adjust their level to minimize the biological impact.

=== Tourist attraction ===
A tourist facility at the dam is open to visitors. The facility attracted approximately 40,000 visitors in 2011. A lock for navigation at the west end of the dam allows the passage of 1,600-tonne vessels between the English Channel and the Rance. Departmental road 168 crosses the dam and allows vehicles to travel between Dinard and Saint-Malo. There is a drawbridge where the road crosses the lock which is raised to allow larger vessels to pass. The Rance estuary is the first part of the inland waterway from the English Channel to the Bay of Biscay via the Canal d'Ille-et-Rance and the river Vilaine.

== See also ==
- List of tidal power stations
- List of largest power stations in the world
- Renewable energy in France
