= Sihwa Lake Tidal Power Station =

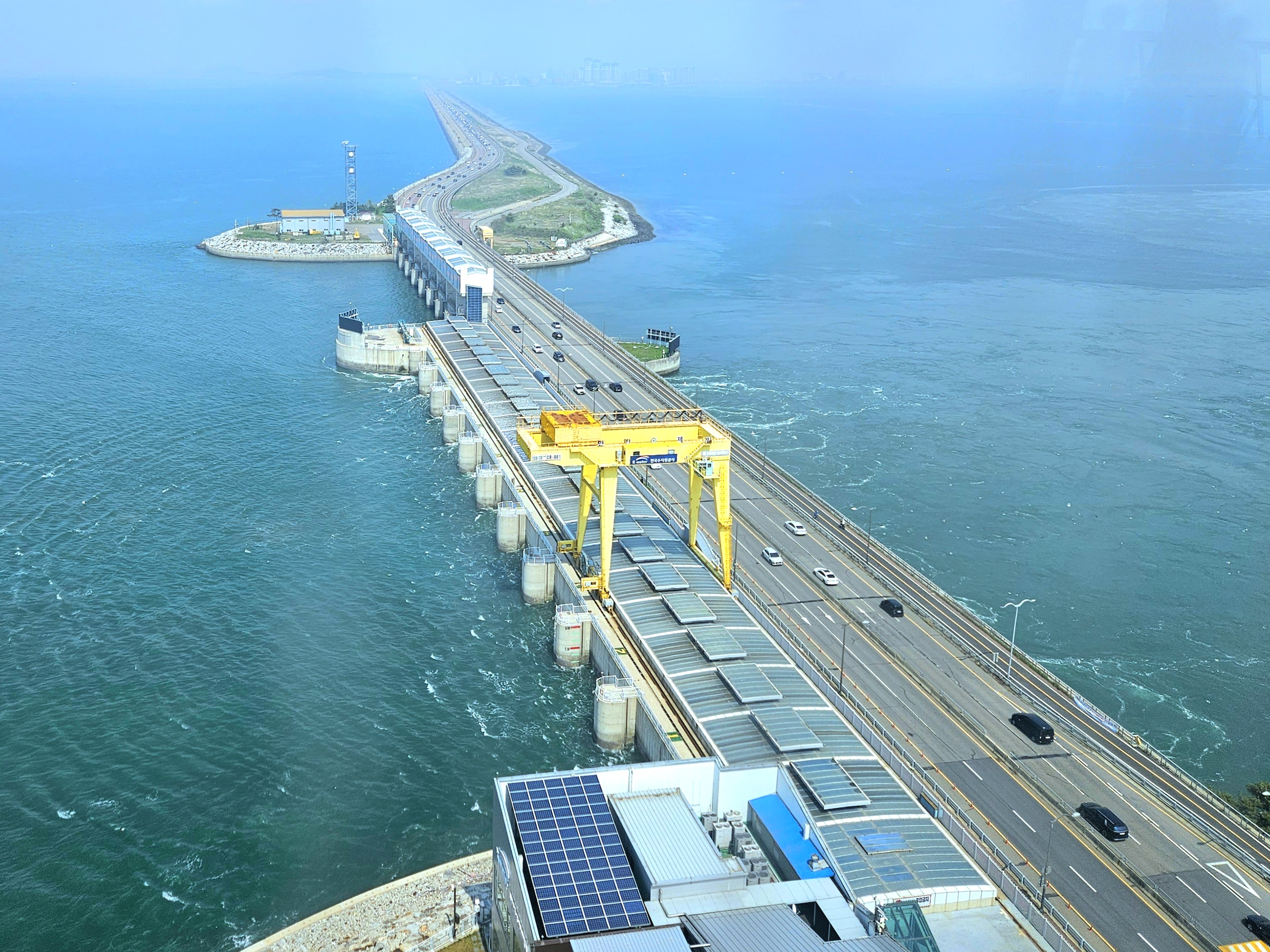

- Location within South Korea
- Country: South Korea
- Location: Sihwa Lake, Gyeonggi Province
- Coordinates: 37°18′47″N 126°36′46″E
- Status: Operational
- Opening date: August 4, 2011
- Construction cost: US$560 million
- Owner: Korea Water Resources Corporation

Power Station
- Type: Tidal barrage
- Turbines: 10 × 25.4 MW
- Installed capacity: 254 MW
- Capacity factor: 24.8%
- Annual generation: 552 GWh

Sihwa Lake Tidal Power Station is the world's largest tidal power installation, with a total power output capacity of 254 MW. When completed in 2011, it surpassed France's 240 MW Rance Tidal Power Station, which was the world's largest for 45 years. It is operated by the Korea Water Resources Corporation.

== Design ==
The tidal barrage makes use of a seawall constructed in 1994 for flood mitigation and agricultural purposes. Ten 25.4 MW submerged bulb turbines are driven in an unpumped flood generation scheme; power is generated on tidal inflows only, and the outflow is sluiced away, i.e. as one-way power generation. This slightly unconventional and relatively inefficient approach has been chosen to balance a complex mix of existing land use, water use, conservation, environmental and power generation considerations.

The station's mean operating tidal range is 5.6 m (18 ft), with a spring tidal range of 7.8 m (26 ft). The working basin area was originally intended to be 43 km^{2} (17 sq mi) and has been reduced by land reclamation and freshwater dykes to 30 km^{2} (12 mi^{2}), likely to be reduced further.

== Construction ==
The power station was built in 2011 and started to operate in 2012. The project cost of US$560 million was borne by the South Korean Government.

== Environmental context ==
After the seawall was built in 1994, pollution built up in the newly created Sihwa Lake reservoir, making its water useless for agriculture. Concentrations of perfluorooctane sulfonate (PFOS) measured in Lake Sihwa were among the greatest ever measured in the environment. In January 2003, PFOS had been found at 730 ng/L in Lake Shihwa water.

In 2004, seawater was reintroduced in the hope of flushing out contamination; inflows from the tidal barrage were envisaged as a complementary permanent solution. As of 2007 the power station was planned to provide this indirect environmental benefit, as well as renewable energy.

== Pictures ==
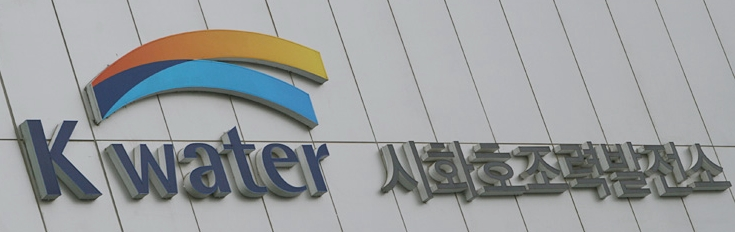
Identity

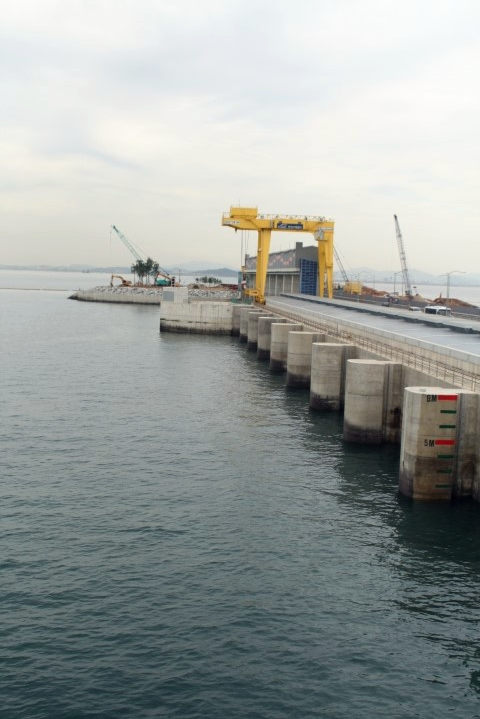
Vertical photo

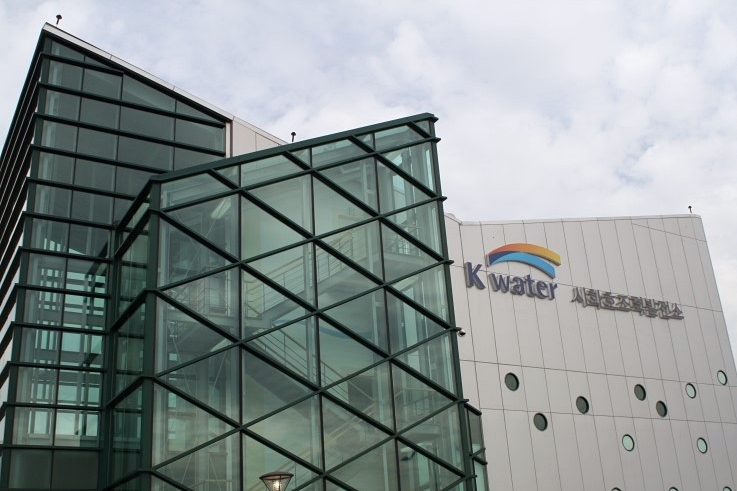
Control room

== See also ==
- List of largest power stations in the world
- List of power stations in South Korea
- List of tidal power stations
