= Rance (river) =

River in France

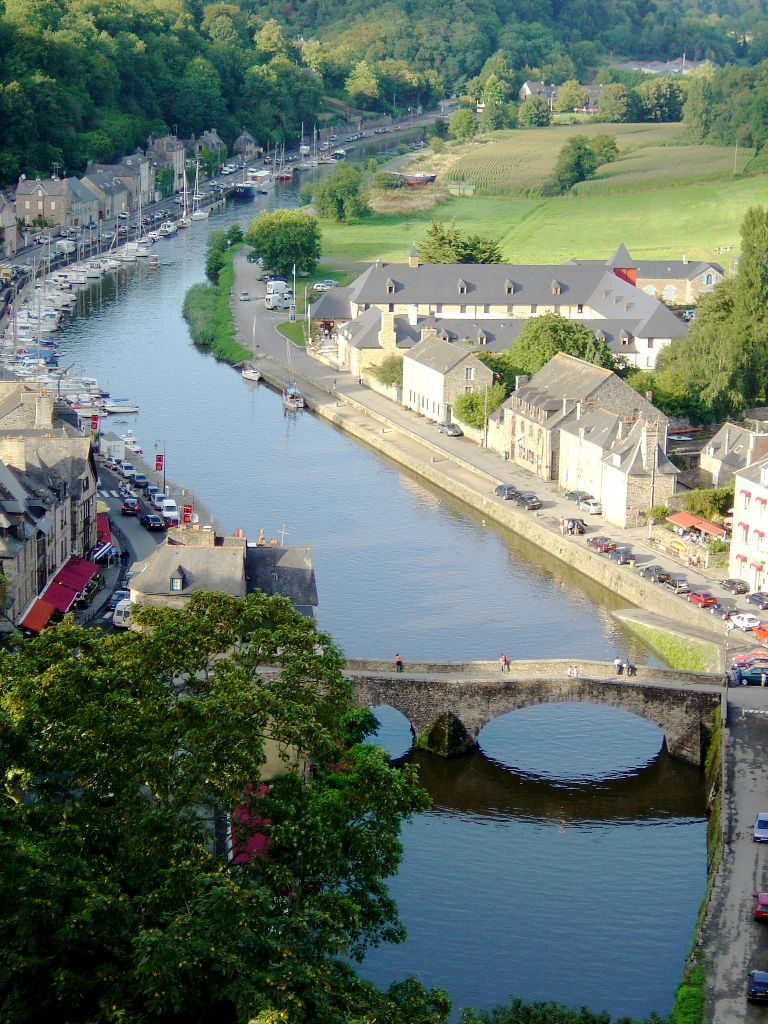
- The Rance in Dinan

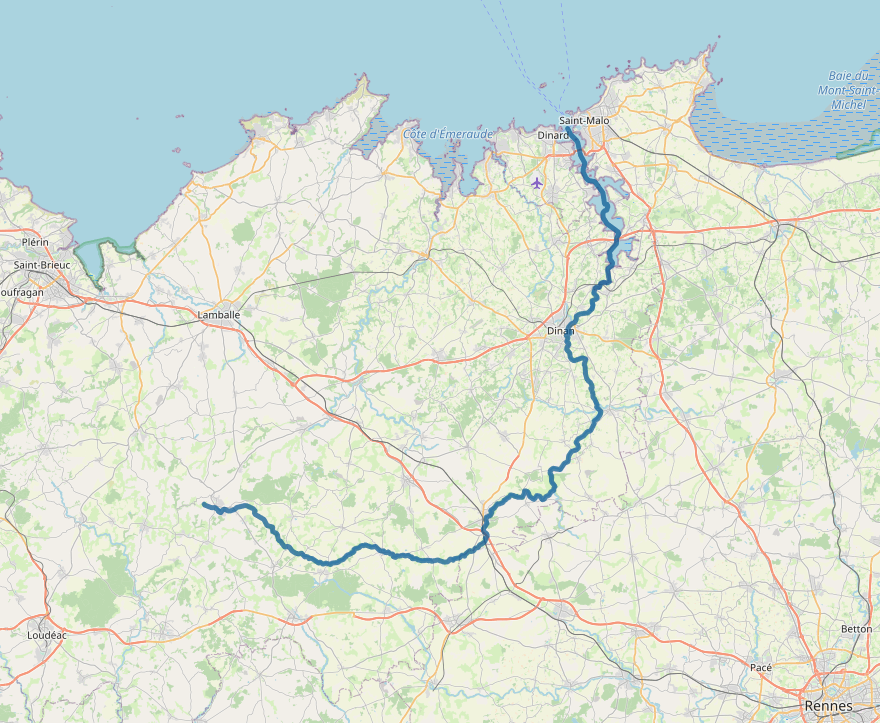

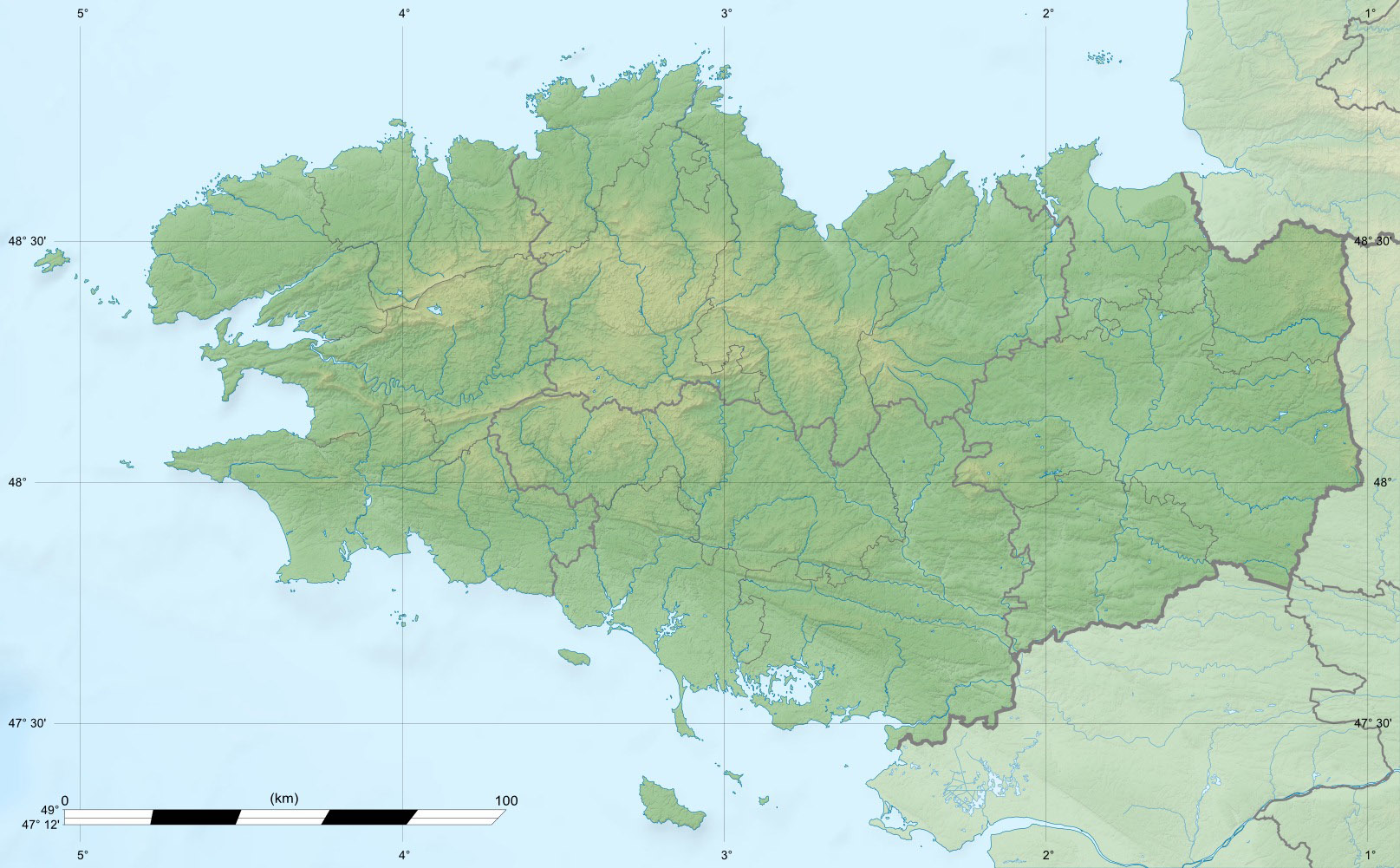
- Location within France Location within Brittany
- Native name: ar Renk (Breton); la Rance (French)

Location
- Country: France

Physical characteristics
- Source
  - location: Brittany
- Mouth
  - location: English Channel
  - coordinates: 48°38′28″N 2°2′26″W
- Length: 104 km (65 mi)
- Basin size: 1,195 km^{2} (461 sq mi)
- Discharge
  - average: 12 m^{3}/s (420 cu ft/s)

The Rance (French pronunciation: [ʁɑ̃s]; Breton: Renk, [ˈrẽŋk]) is a river of northwestern France. It is 103.6 km (64.4 mi) long. The semi-tidal river flows into the English Channel between Dinard and Saint-Malo.

Before reaching the Channel, its waters are barred by a 750 metre long dam forming the Rance tidal power plant.

The river is linked to the Vilaine by means of the Canal d'Ille-et-Rance.

Départements and towns along the river:

- Côtes-d'Armor: Collinée, Caulnes, Dinan
- Ille-et-Vilaine: Dinard, Saint-Malo

== Hydrology and water quality ==
Tributaries of the Rance include:

- Croqueloir
- Clergé
- Fremeur
- Quinéford

This river has moderate turbidity and its brownish water is somewhat low in velocity due to the slight gradient of the watercourse; pH levels have been measured at 8.13 within the city of Dinan and electrical conductivity of the waters have tested at 33 micro-siemens per centimetre. At this reference location, summer flows are typically in the range of 14 cubic metres per second (500 cu ft/s).
