= Annapolis Royal Generating Station =

Canadian tidal power generating station

Annapolis Tidal Station
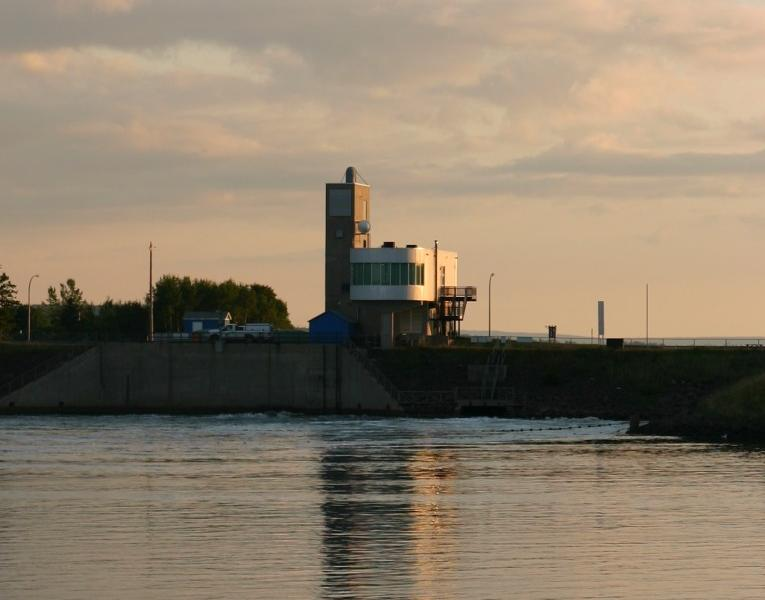
- The Annapolis Tidal Station at high tide.
- Official name: Annapolis Tidal Station
- Country: Canada
- Location: Annapolis Royal, Nova Scotia
- Coordinates: 44°45′7″N 65°30′40″W
- Status: Decommissioned
- Commission date: 1984
- Decommission date: 2019
- Owner: Nova Scotia Power

Thermal power station
- Primary fuel: Tide

Tidal power station
- Type: Tidal barrage

Power generation
- Nameplate capacity: 20 MW
- Annual net output: 50 GWh

External links
- Website: www.nspower.ca/en/home/about-us/how-we-make-electricity/renewable-electricity/annapolis-tidal-station.aspx
- Commons: Related media on Commons

The Annapolis Royal Generating Station was a tidal power generating station in the Bay of Fundy in Nova Scotia, Canada. When operational, it was the only tidal generating station in North America and was one of the few in the world. Located upstream of Annapolis Royal, Nova Scotia, it generated about 30 million kilowatt hours per year, enough for 4500 houses. Peak output was 20 megawatts.

The station was shut down in April 2019, after the Canadian Science Advisory Secretariat found substantial fish mortality caused by the turbine, and a crucial component failed within the generating system. For example, research from the 1980s showed almost one quarter of the American shad passing through were killed. The station operated 34 years, mostly with minimal regulatory scrutiny.

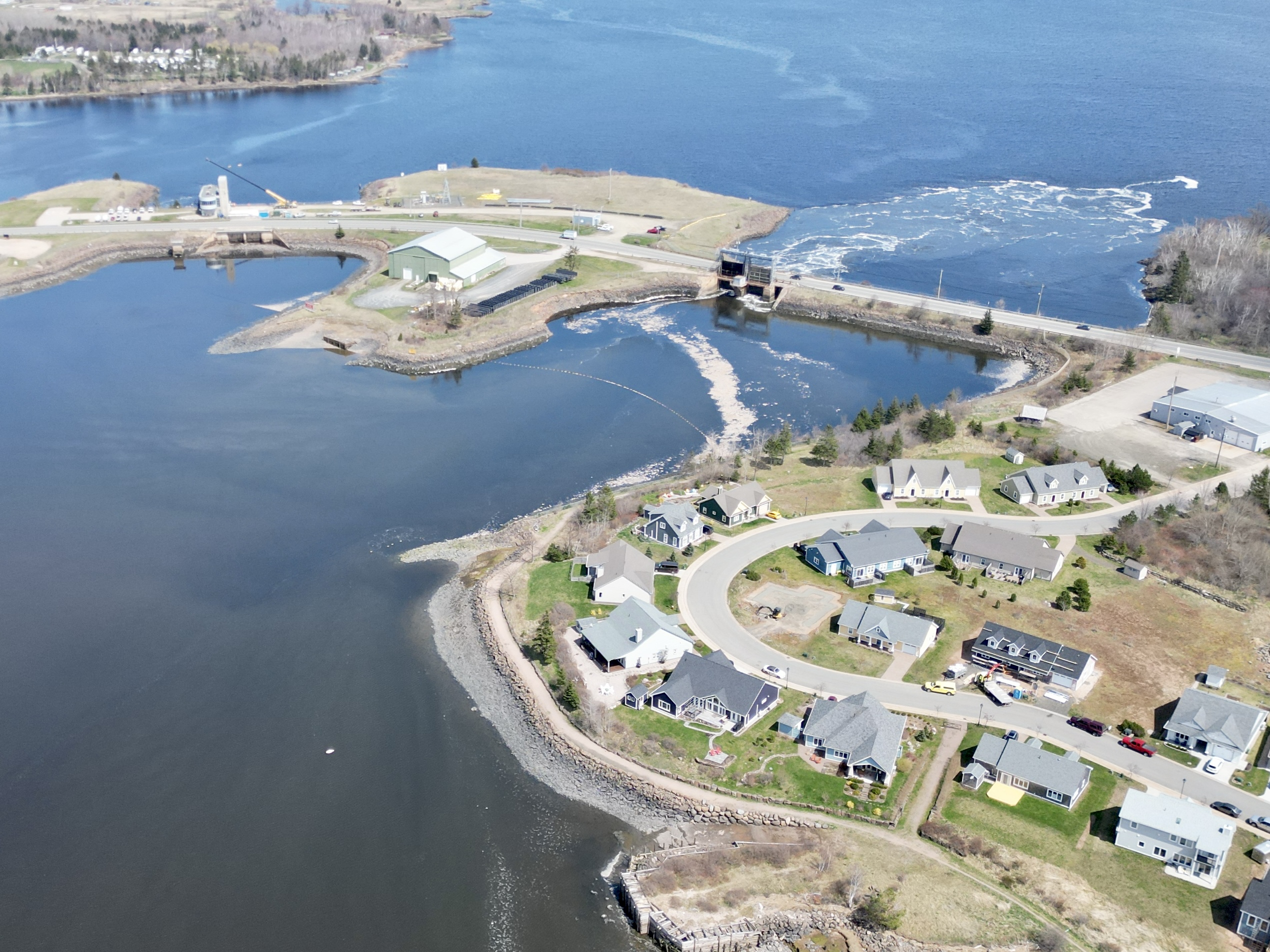
The generating station and the Highway 1 causeway from Annapolis Royal to Granville Ferry

A causeway on the Annapolis River created a reservoir which powered a water turbine. Sluice gates in the causeway allowed the reservoir to be refilled by the incoming tide, and retain the water in the reservoir when the tide recedes. Power was only generated when the tide was out, for about five hours, twice a day.

Construction began in 1980, and it opened in 1984. It was constructed by Nova Scotia Power, at the time a provincial crown corporation.

The decision to build the facility was partly prompted by the promise of federal funding for this alternative energy project, and the existence of a rock-filled causeway which had been built on the Annapolis River in 1960 by the Maritime Marshlands Reclamation Authority to block the Bay of Fundy tides from entering the river to replace the function of the existing dykes along the river banks. The causeway housed the power house and sluice gates.

The blocking of water flow by the causeway has resulted in increased river bank erosion on both the upstream and downstream sides. The causeway is also known as a trap for marine life. In 2004, a mature humpback whale swam through the open sluice gate at slack tide, ending up trapped for several days in the upper part of the river before eventually finding its way out.

== See also ==
- Energy in Canada
- Renewable energy in Canada
- Hydroelectricity in Canada
