= Tidal power in the United Kingdom =

Tidal power contributes a very small proportion of the electricity generation in the United Kingdom, but it could provide a meaningful amount of predictable renewable energy in future.

Several tidal stream turbines to harness currents flowing around the coastline have been developed and tested in the UK, and some of the world's first tidal stream arrays have been operating in Scotland since 2016. As of 2024, there is over 120 MW of tidal stream projected to be built by 2029.

Various proposals have also been developed in the UK for tidal range schemes, using barrages or lagoons, but none have been built.

== Tidal power resource ==
There are two main forms of tidal resource:

- Tidal range, harnessing potential energy from the height difference between high and low tides, impounding water in a tidal barrage or lagoon.
- Tidal stream, harnessing kinetic energy of the tidal streams and currents flowing around the coastline using free-stream turbines.

There could be up to 20 GW of tidal range resource in the UK, able to generate 30 TWh/year or around 12% of the UK's electricity demand.

A recent review of the tidal stream resource in the UK and British Channel Islands supported the latest national-scale practical resource estimate of 34 TWh/year. At around 11.5 GW of installed capacity, this is equivalent to 11% of the UK demand.

== Tidal turbine development and testing in the UK ==
The European Marine Energy Centre (EMEC) was set up in 2003, and has pre-consented sites for testing wave power devices and tidal stream turbines. The grid-connected tidal side is in the Fall of Warness, to the west of Eday in Orkney. The first turbine tested was a 250 kW OpenHydro turbine, installed in December 2006. Since then, multiple devices from different developers have been tested.

Peter Fraenkel tested a 15 kW tidal turbine in Loch Linnhe in 1994. Fraenkel set up Marine Current Turbines (MCT), and demonstrated the 300 kW SeaFlow turbine off Lynmouth, England in 2003. MCT then built the twin-rotor 1.2 MW SeaGen turbine, which was installed in Strangford Lough, Northern Ireland, from 2008 until it was decommissioned between 2016 and 2019, having generated over 11.6 GWh of electricity.

Atlantis Resources (now Ampeak Energy) developed and tested a series of turbines: the AK-1000 in 2010, the 1 MW AR1000 was tested at EMEC in 2011, and the 1.5 MW AR1500 turbines in conjunction with Lockheed Martin in 2015. Three AR1500 turbines were installed at MeyGen in 2017. In 2021, an AR500 turbine was tested in Japan, which was subsequently upgraded to an AR1100 in 2022. In October 2022, the Advanced Tidal Engineering and Services division of SIMEC Atlantis Energy became an independent company, Proteus Marine Renewables. In 2024, Proteus unveiled their AR3000 turbines to be used in the Normandie Hydroliennes NH1 project.

Edinburgh-based Nova Innovation deployed their first 30 kW turbine in the Bluemull Sound, Shetland in 2014. Since 2016, they have operated an array of up to six of their 100 kW turbines in the Bluemull Sound.

Scotrenewables Tidal Power (now Orbital Marine Power) tested their floating SR250 turbine at EMEC in 2012, which was the world's first grid connected floating tidal turbine. They then tested a 2 MW version, the SR2000, in 2017/18, generating over 3 GWh in a year. The Orbital O2 was launched from Dundee in April 2021, and is undergoing long-term tests at EMEC since.

Several other British companies have developed tidal stream turbines, but were not commercially successful. This includes Pulse Tidal, Sustainable Marine Energy, Tidal Energy Ltd, and Tidal Generation Ltd.

== Government support programmes ==
=== Renewables Obligation ===
The Renewables Obligation (RO), with associated schemes in Scotland and Northern Ireland, was intended to encourage generation of renewable electricity. Renewables obligation certificates (ROCs) are issued to generators free of charge. There is then a market to trade these, with electricity suppliers required to present a certain number every year to Ofgem.

All technologies were initially awarded 1 ROC per MWh, but following a review in 2007, a four-level banding was introduced. Tidal was in the "emerging" band, and received increased support, at 2 ROCs/MWh. A further banding review in 2012 increased support for tidal power to 5 ROCs/MWh, subject to a 30 MW limit per generating station. The scheme closed to new generation in March 2017.

In 2024, there were nine accredited tidal stream generating stations listed in the Renewables and CHP Register. These were: five berths at the EMEC Fall of Warness site near Eday, the MeyGen project (Ness of Quoys), the Nova Innovation Shetland tidal array, the Tidal Energy Ltd Ramsey Sound DeltaStream project, and the SeaGen turbine in Strangford Lough, Northern Ireland.

=== Contracts for Difference ===
The Contracts for Difference (CfD) scheme is the main market support mechanism for low carbon generation in the UK. Capacity is awarded via a competitive auction process. Tidal stream was eligible to bid into the first three allocation rounds (AR) but no technology was successful.

A £20m ringfence was introduced for tidal stream technology in the fourth allocation round (AR4) in 2022. This resulted in four projects, totalling over 40 MW being awarded contracts. A further 53 MW was awarded CfD in AR5, despite the ringfence being reduced to £10m, capitalising on the fact no floating offshore wind projects were successful. The tidal ringfence was increased to £15m by the incoming Labour government, which secured a further 28 MW of tidal stream CfD in 2024. This gives a pipeline of over 120 MW expected to be operational by 2029, to be developed at EMEC, Meygen, and Morlais.

Tidal stream CfD projects
| Developer | Site | Delivery year | | | | Total |
| Developer | Site | 2025/26 | 2026/27 | 2027/28 | 2028/29 | Total |
|---|---|---|---|---|---|---|
| Hydrowing/Inyanga Marine | Morlais | | | 20.0 | | 20.0 |
| Magallanes Tidal Energy | EMEC | | | 1.5 | 3.0 | 4.5 |
| Magallanes Tidal Energy | Morlais | 5.6 | | 3.0 | | 8.6 |
| Ampeak Energy | MeyGen | | 28.0 | 21.9 | 9.0 | 58.9 |
| Mor Energy | Morlais | | 4.5 | | | 4.5 |
| Nova Innovation | EMEC | | | | 6.0 | 6.0 |
| Orbital Marine Power | EMEC | | 7.2 | 7.2 | | 14.4 |
| Verdant Isles Ltd | Morlais | | | 4.9 | | 4.9 |
| Total | | 5.6 | 39.7 | 58.5 | 18.0 | 121.9 |

== Tidal stream projects ==
=== Operational ===
As of 2024, there are three operational grid-connected tidal stream sites in the UK, all located in the north of Scotland. This includes the EMEC Fall of Warness test site.

The Nova Innovation project in the Bluemull Sound, Shetland, is claimed as the "world's first" tidal array, with two 100 kW turbines installed in 2016. The array was expanded to six turbines in 2023, however the three oldest turbines were decommissioned later that year.

At 6 MW, the MeyGen project in the Pentland Firth is the world's largest tidal stream project in 2024. The first turbine was installed in November 2016. Three further turbines were installed by February 2017, and the first phase entered commercial operation in April 2018. There are plans to expand the site to 400 MW in phases, with the project securing CfD in 2022, 2023, and 2024 for a total of 59 MW to be constructed by 2029. It is operated by Ampeak Energy (formerly SAE Renewables and SIMEC Atlantis).

=== Planned ===
In addition to the MeyGen project expansion, there are several other planned tidal stream projects in the UK.

The Morlais project has the potential for up to 240 MW of tidal stream generation off the coast of Holy Island, Anglesey, North Wales. As of September 2024, a total of four developers have secured CfD to develop a combined 38 MW of capacity at Morlais. The first turbines are expected to be installed in 2026.

There are also three developers planning arrays at EMEC, with a total of 25 MW awarded in CfD AR4–AR6.

== Tidal range proposals ==
Tidal range schemes tend to involve large dams or barriers to impound the water, and as such could have significant environmental impacts.

Various schemes have been proposed for a Severn Barrage between England and Wales, potentially generating between 1 GW and 15 GW of renewable electricity. This would harness the significant tidal range of the Severn Estuary, the second largest tides globally. In addition to tidal power, these may also have offered transport links, flood control or harbour creation. In 2010, the UK government announced there was no strategic case for investing in a scheme to build a barrage 10 miles (16 km) long, which could cost over £30bn. However, in 2022 following the Russian invasion of Ukraine, the government launched an independent commission to revisit proposals.

Slightly smaller scale impoundment was proposed for the Tidal Lagoon Swansea Bay project. A breakwater 9.5 kilometres (5.9 mi) long and up to 4 kilometres (2.5 mi) from shore was proposed to impound the tide. Bi-directional turbines meant the scheme was expected to generate power around 14 hours a day. Despite backing from the Welsh Government, the UK government claimed the £1.3bn project was not good value for money. In addition to Swansea Bay, the developer Tidal Lagoon Power was also considering lagoons at Cardiff; Newport; Bridgwater Bay in the Severn Estuary; Colwyn Bay in North Wales; and West Cumbria.

A Mersey Barrage across the River Mersey estuary between Liverpool and the Wirral Peninsula has been proposed, with an initial public consultation on the scheme in October 2024. The project development and planning stage is expected to take until 2028, with construction and commissioning taking a further 10 years. The scheme could potentially generate up to 1 GW, and may incorporate walking and cycling paths across the estuary.

== See also ==
- Development of tidal stream generators
- List of tidal power stations
