= Rhea =

Rhea often refers to:

- Rhea (bird), genus of flightless birds native to South America
- Rhea (moon), a moon of Saturn
- Rhea (mythology), a Titaness in Greek mythology
- Rhea (name), list of people with this name

It may also refer to:

== Mythology ==
- Rhea Silvia, in Roman mythology the mother of the twins Romulus and Remus
- Riadh or Rhea, Celtic mythological hero
- Rhea, mother of Aventinus (mythology) by Hercules

== Science and technology ==
- 577 Rhea, an asteroid
- Green ramie or rhea, a bast fibre plant
- Rhea (database), a biochemical reaction knowledge base
- Rhea (pipeline), a set of scripts in R for the analysis of microbial profiles

== Places ==
- Rhea, Arkansas
- Rhea County, Tennessee
- Rhea Springs, Tennessee, a defunct town
- Île de Ré or Rhea, an island in France

== Music ==
- Rhea, a 1908 opera by Spyridon Samaras
- Rhea, a 1988 composition for 12 saxophones by Francisco Guerrero Marín
- "Rhea", a song on the 1997 album Did Tomorrow Come... by Polish heavy metal band Sirrah

== Ships ==
- USS Rhea (AMc-58), a coastal minesweeper launched in 1941
- USS Rhea (AMS-52), a minesweeper launched in 1942

== See also ==
- Rheea Mukherjee
- Rhea County Courthouse, historic building in Tennessee, US
- Rhea–McEntire House, an historic mansion in Alabama, US
- Rheia (album), a 2016 album by Belgian band Oathbreaker
- Riya, a feminine given name
- Rea (disambiguation)
- RIA (disambiguation)
