= Peter Fraenkel =

Peter Fraenkel may refer to:

- Peter Fraenkel (journalist) (1926–2024), journalist and author, controller of European services for the British Broadcasting Corporation
- Peter Fraenkel (marine engineer), British marine engineer
- Peter Fraenkel (civil engineer) (1915–2009), British civil engineer
