= Orkney tunnel =

Proposed road tunnel in Highland, Scotland

The Orkney tunnel is a suggested undersea road tunnel between Orkney and Caithness on the Scottish mainland. The expected length of it would be about 9–10 miles (15–16 km).

Orkney Islands in Scotland

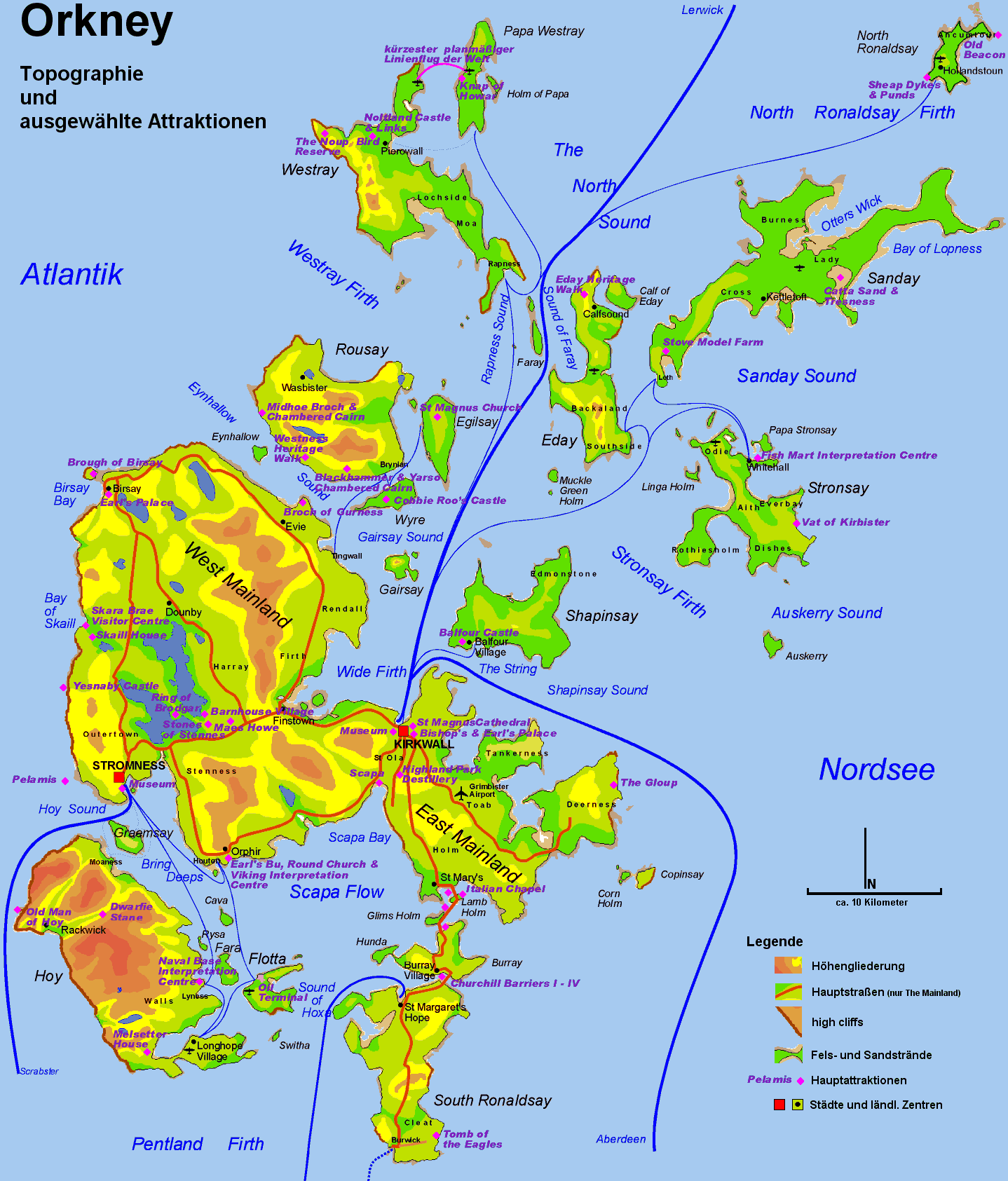
Map of Orkney showing topography and main transport routes

== History ==
The tunnel, if constructed, is assumed to make landfall on South Ronaldsay. In 2005, the tunnel was discussed, and then a total bill of £100 million was mentioned. There has not been so much discussion after 2005.

There are also suggested plans to connect Orkney Mainland to Shapinsay.

The Orkney Islands have been an important base for receiving and processing crude oil and natural gas from the North Sea, through the Flotta oil terminal, located in Scapa Flow.

However, with the depletion of oil reserves and the developments of the tidal power in the Pentland Firth in 2017 (hosting the MeyGen project), the idea of a tunnel has lost ground, though there have been discussions of the construction of a bridge over the top of a Pentland Tidal Array.
