= Kyle Rhea =

Strait between Skye and Scottish mainland

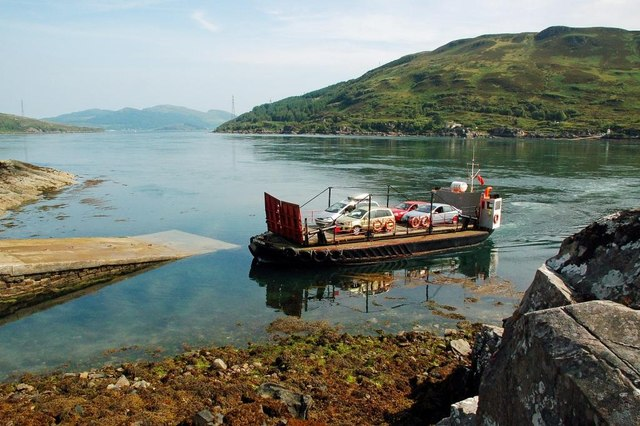
- The ferry MV Glenachulish on Kyle Rhea, beside Kylerhea pier. This view is looking north

- Location of Kyle Rhea

Location
- Country: Scotland
- County: Highlands

Physical characteristics
- Source
  - coordinates: 57°10′47″N 5°42′06″W
- Mouth
  - coordinates: 57°15′17″N 5°38′28″W
- Length: 6.0 mi (9.7 km)

Kyle Rhea is a strait of water in the Highland area of Scotland. It runs from the Sound of Sleat and the Inner Seas off the West Coast of Scotland in the southwest to Loch Alsh in the north, separating the Isle of Skye from Inverness-shire on the Scottish mainland. It gave its name to Kylerhea, a village on its western shore.

Loch Hourn branches off to the east of Loch Alsh, north of Kyle Rhea. The spring tide at Kyle Rhea can reach up to 8 knots (15 km/h; 9.2 mph), complicating passage by small vessels.

Just north of Kylerhea, a ferry service has linked the village with Glenelg on the mainland for centuries. The first car ferry was introduced in 1935, with a turntable located on the boat. Despite the existence of the now toll-free Skye Bridge, this ferry service, undertaken by the MV Glenachulish, still runs during the summer months, due to its popularity as the more scenic and traditional route between Skye and the mainland. This service is now community-owned but used to be run by Murdo Mackenzie for almost twenty years.

Before the ferry, Kyle Rhea was an important crossing for cattle drovers, where as many as 4000 beasts swam across each year, en-route to markets as far away as London. They were lashed together for the 550 yards (500 m) crossing.

Kyle Rhea is mentioned in Sir Thomas Dick Lauder's novel Highland Legends. The book, and subsequent film, the Ring of Bright Water by Gavin Maxwell was set in Sandaig near Glenelg, at the southern end of Kyle Rhea.

== Maritime incidents ==
Several maritime incidents have occurred in the fast flowing waters of Kyle Rhea, with vessels running around.

In February 2018, the cargo vessel CEG Universe ran aground near Glenelg after it suffered a rudder failure. The vessel was later towed to Kyle of Lochalsh.

In February 2022, a 10 m (33 ft) fishing vessel suffered electrical problems and ran aground. RNLI lifeboats from Mallaig and Kyle of Lochalsh attended, and towed the vessel back to Mallaig harbour.

In August 2023, the salmon farming well boat Settler ran aground near Kylerhea at high tide. The crew was removed from the 103 ft (31 m) vessel overnight for safety.

In October 2024, a cargo ship ran aground in Kyle Rhea. The incident happened in the early hours of Monday 7th without injury, and the 88 m (289 ft) long ship was later refloated.

== Tidal power ==
Marine Current Turbines (MCT) proposed plans to develop a small tidal power project in the Kyle Rhea, comprising four 1.2 MW SeaGen turbines. A scoping study was prepared by MCT in 2010, with a full environmental impact assessment completed by Royal Haskoning in 2013. The project was later dropped following the acquisition of MCT by Siemens and then Atlantis Resources (now SAE Renewables).

== Gallery ==
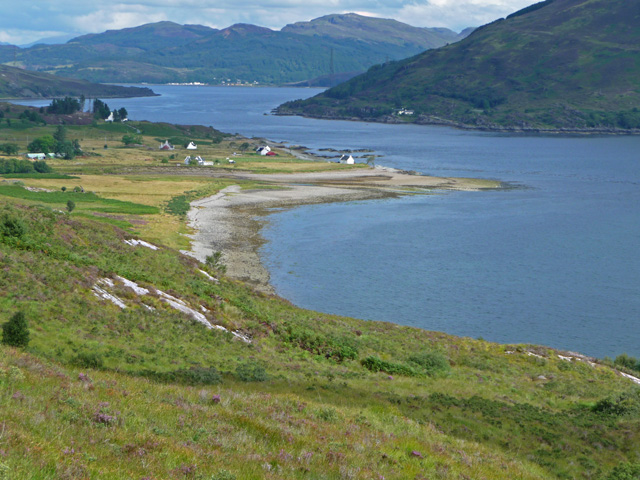
Looking north along the strait towards Kylerhea and Loch Alsh
