= Development of tidal stream generators =

Many tidal stream generators have been developed over the years to harness the power of tidal currents flowing around coastlines. These are also called tidal stream turbines (TST), tidal energy converters (TEC), or marine hydro-kinetic (MHK) generation. These turbines operate on a similar principle to wind turbines, but are designed to work in a fluid approximately 800 times more dense than air which is moving at a slower velocity. Note that tidal barrages or lagoons operate on a different principle, generating power by impounding the rising and falling tide.

Lots of different technology variants have been tested, and there has not been convergence on a predominant typology. Most have been horizontal-axis, like wind turbines, but with 2, 3, or more blades and either mounted on a seabed fixed foundation or on a floating platform. In addition, vertical-axis turbines and tidal kites are also being developed.

Historically, development has largely been focused around Europe, but devices have been built and tested in North America – including at the Fundy Ocean Research Centre for Energy (FORCE), Japan, and elsewhere. The European Marine Energy Centre (EMEC) was set up in Orkney in 2003, and developed a tidal test site in the Fall of Warness, to the west of the island of Eday. The site opened in 2006, and EMEC was granted a license in 2016 to test up to 10 MW of tidal stream devices, and has since hosted the testing of many of these devices.

There have been various acquisitions of technology developers over the years. Many of the companies are no longer trading, or have ceased development of tidal-stream turbines. However, the first pre-commercial array demonstration projects have been operating since around 2016. Building on this, commercial arrays are expected to be operational by around 2027, at EMEC, Morlais and elsewhere.

== Development timeline ==
Key historical milestones in the development of tidal-stream turbines are summarised below:

- The 300 kW Marine Current Turbines (MCT) SeaFlow turbine was installed in summer 2003 and tested off the coast of Lynmouth, Devon, England.
- In 2004, the world's first tidal-stream turbine was connected to an electricity grid, the 300 kW Hammerfest Strøm HS300, located in the waters of Kvalsundet, Finnmark, Norway.
- The first tidal stream turbine test site was constructed in 2005 and opened in 2006, in the Fall of Wanress to the west of Eday, Orkney, part of the European Marine Energy Centre.
- The significantly more powerful, 1.2 MW MCT SeaGen turbine was installed in Strangford Lough, Northern Ireland, in May 2008 and grid connected in July.
- Also in May 2008, OpenHydro was the first tidal turbine connected to the National Grid in Great Britain (GB). The 250 kW device was tested in the Fall of Warness, Eday, Orkney.
- Verdant Power installed six 35 kW turbines in New York's East River, supplying power to two local businesses, claimed as the world's first tidal array.
- In August 2016, Nova Innovation installed a second 100 kW turbine in the Bluemull Sound, Shetland, connected to the GB Grid, also claimed as the world's first tidal array.
- A dedicated site for testing tidal stream turbines was pre-consented at the European Marine Energy Centre in 2016, to simplify the process for developers testing devices.
- Phase 1 of the MeyGen project was commissioned in 2017, with four turbines totaling 6 MW installed, making it the largest tidal array to date.

== Key companies and turbines ==
Many companies have focused on the development of technology to harness tidal stream energy. A non-exhaustive list of key companies is given below.

=== Alstom ===
French manufacturer Alstom acquired Tidal Generation Ltd in 2012, but this part of the business was sold to General Electric in 2015.

=== Andritz Hydro Hammerfest ===
Hammerfest Strøm AS was a Norwegian developer of tidal stream turbines, based in Hammerfest. In 2010, Austrian hydropower company Andritz AG bought one third of the shares. In 2012, Andritz became the majority stakeholder and rebranded the company Andritz Hydro Hammerfest.

In November 2003, Hammerfest Strøm installed their HS300 turbine in Kvalsundet, Norway. This 300 kW prototype was a 20 m diameter three-bladed horizontal-axis turbine. It sat on a monopile foundation in 50 m deep water. In 2003, the project was reported to have cost US$11m. The HS300 turbine was connected to the grid in 2004, and operated for over 16,000 hours before it was decommissioned in 2011 and removed in 2012.

A more powerful 1MW device was then tested at EMEC from 2012. The HS1000 was a 21 m diameter three-bladed horizontal-axis turbine, installed at the Fall of Warness test site in December 2011.

Three Andritz Hydro Hammerfest Mk1 turbines were installed as part of phase 1 of the MeyGen project in 2016. These turbines are also three-bladed, but with an 18 m diameter rotor and each rated at 1.5 MW. These machines have generated in excess of 80GWh to date, and one machines has remained subsea and in operation for over 6 years to date.

=== BigMoon Power ===
BigMoon Power was a Canadian company founded in 2015 developing a floating tidal stream generator. The concept is designed to be simple, with an optimised waterwheel (called a Kinetic Keel) mounted between two hulls of a barge, moored by foundations built from old train cars filled with concrete. BigMoon plan to build and install 18 devices, each 0.5 MW, at in the Bay of Fundy at FORCE. As part of the contract to test at FORCE Berth D, BigMoon was expected to remove before the end of 2024 the OpenHydro turbine that was abandoned there in July 2018 when that company went into administration. In May 2024, Big Moon Power rebranded as Occurrent Power, however in September 2024 it filed for insolvency, having failed to deploy the turbine.

=== Flumill ===
Flumill AS is a Norwegian developer of an unconventional tidal stream turbine. It consists of two counter-rotating helical screws made from fiberglass, each attached to a gear-less permanent magnet generator. The unit is mounted to the seabed and held up by a buoyant float/fin. In 2011 Flumill was the first turbine to be tested at the EMEC Shapinsay Sound non-grid-connected test site, after tow tests in Tromøysund, Arendal, Norway. This device was nominally rated at 120 kW in the 1.5 m/s currents of Shapinsay Sound, although it could potentially generate 600 kW in faster flows.

A phase 2 Flumill tidal device is currently being developed, where the screws and generators are mounted from a catamaran barge.

=== General Electric ===
In 2015, GE acquired the energy assets from Alstom which included the business originally developed by Tidal Generation Ltd.

In 2024, GE Vernova signed a MoU with Proteus Marine Renewables to supply electrical systems for their tidal turbines.

=== HydroQuest ===
HydroQuest is a French developer of vertical-axis turbines, generating electricity from river and tidal currents, based in Grenoble. They have installed several small river turbines in France and French Guiana, powering the 200 inhabitants of the Camopi village.

A 1 MW OceanQuest tidal turbine was tested at Paimpol–Bréhat between April 2019 and December 2021.

In collaboration with Constructions Mécaniques de Normandie and renewable energy company Qair, Hydroquest are developing the FloWatt project. This will comprise seven Hydroquest turbine units, each rated at 2.5 MW, to be installed at Raz Blanchard, Brittany by 2027.

=== LHD New Energy Corporation ===
LHD New Energy Corporation have developed the Zhoushan tidal power station near Xiushan island, Daishan County, China. This platform above the sea is connected to land by a bridge. In 2016, the first two turbines were installed and connected to the grid, rated at 400 kW and 600 kW. In December 2018, two further turbines were added, a 300 kW horizontal-axis and a 400 kW vertical-axis, taking the total installed capacity to 1.7 MW.

=== Magallanes Renovables ===
Magallanes Renovables, S.L. is a Spanish developer of floating tidal energy devices, set up in 2009. They tested a grid-connected 1.5 MW ATIR device at EMEC between 2019 and 2023, having previously tested a small scale device at the EMEC nursery test site in Shapinsay Sound, although this was not grid-connected. Magallanes has been awarded Contracts for Difference (CfD) to supply subsidised electricity to the GB National Grid, at Morlais and at EMEC.

=== Marine Current Turbines ===
Marine Current Turbines (MCT) was a Bristol-based company that developed seabed mounted tidal-stream turbines. In June 2003, MCT installed the 300 kW Seaflow turbine in Lynmouth, Devon. The larger 1.2 MW SeaGen turbine was installed in Strangford Lough in May 2008, and connected tot the Irish electricity grid in July. It was decommissioned in stages between May 2016 and July 2019, having exported 11.6 GWh of electricity.

=== Minesto ===
Minesto AB is a Swedish developer of tidal kite turbines, based in Gothenburg. The company tested a 500 kW Deep Green DG500 turbine in the Holyhead Deep off the coast of Anglesey, North Wales in 2018 and 2019. In 2022, they installed two 100 kW Dragon 4 turbines at Vestmannasund in the Faroe Islands, and are planning to install a 1.2 MW Dragon 12 turbine there in 2024.

=== Nova Innovation ===
Nova Innovation Ltd is an Edinburgh-based developer of small bed-mounted tidal-stream turbines. They deployed their first 30 kW turbine in the Bluemull Sound, Shetland, and have operated an array of up-to 6 of their 100 kW turbines in the Bluemull Sound since 2016.

=== Ocean Renewable Power Company ===
Ocean Renewable Power Company (ORPC, Inc.) is a developer of cross-flow turbines to harness river, tidal and ocean currents, based in Portland, Maine.

=== OpenHydro ===
OpenHydro Group Ltd was an Irish developer of tidal stream turbines, acquired by Naval Energies (then DCNS) in 2013, but ceased trading in 2018. OpenHydro developed a novel open-centred horizontal-axis turbine, surrounded by a ducting shroud. Various iterations of the OpenHydro turbines were tested in Scotland, France and Canada.

=== Orbital Marine Power ===
Orbital Marine Power Ltd is an Orkney-based developer of floating tidal stream turbines that have twin rotors either side of a long tubular hull. Their third-generation turbine, the 2 MW Orbital O2 has been deployed at the Fall of Warness since 2021. The company was founded in 2002 as Scotrenewables Tidal Power Ltd, but rebranded in 2019.

=== Proteus Marine Renewables ===
In October 2022, Proteus Marine Renewables (PMR) was formed through a management buyout of the Advanced Tidal Engineering and Services division of SIMEC Atlantis Energy, which rebranded as SAE Renewables, and then Ampeak Energy. SAE remain a minority shareholder in Proteus, and Proteus will continue to support the MeyGen tidal farm. The company is based at Bath & Bristol Science Park, Bristol, England.

Proteus is a majority shareholder in Normandie Hydroliennes, which is planning to deploy a 12 MW pilot tidal farm at Raz Blanchard in 2025. The NH1 project will consist of four PMR AR3000 turbines, each rated at 3 MW.

In August 2024, PMR started building an AR1100 turbine to be deployed in the Naru Strait to power the Gotō Islands in Japan. This is an upgrade of the AR500 turbine with added pitch and yaw mechanisms, and uprated to 1.1 MW. The AR500 was previously tested in the Naru Strait from February 2021 to December 2023. The AR1100 was installed in February 2025, using local vessels.

In November 2024, Proteus signed a MoU with SKF to supply the rotating equipment and GE Vernova to supply electrical systems for their tidal turbines.

=== Pulse Tidal ===
Pulse Tidal Ltd was an English tidal stream developer, formed in 2007 after 10 years of development. They developed a fully-submerged oscillating hydrofoil device, designed to work in shallow water, with horizontal blades that moved up and down in the passing current. A 100 kW, prototype was installed in 2009 at Immingham Dock, in the Humber estuary, which could generate up to 150 kW for a nearby chemicals plant.

The company was awarded €8m in European funding to develop the first commercial prototype, expected to be rated at 1.2 MW, and deployed at Lynmouth, Devon, where Pulse Tidal had been awarded a seabed lease from the Crown Estate. The company was also developing plans for the Kyle Rhea Narrows between the mainland of Scotland and Skye.

Pulse Tidal was liquidated in 2014.

=== Sabella ===
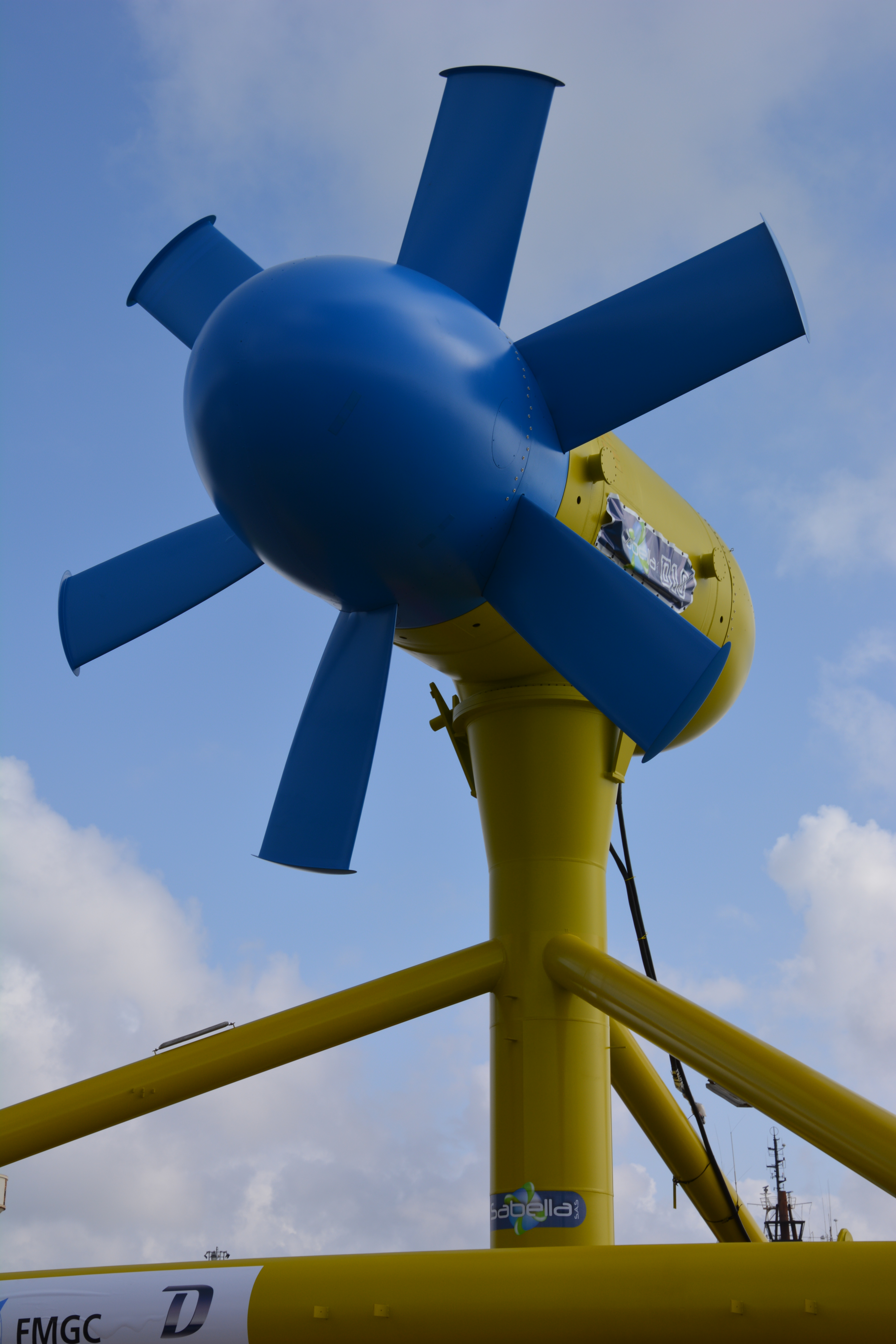
Sabella D10 turbine

Sabella SAS was a French SME based in Quimper, Brittany that has been developing tidal turbines since 2008, however the company was placed into receivership in October 2023. The company had developed two main variants of their technology.

The D03 was a 30 kW horizontal-axis turbine, with a six-bladed rotor 3 m in diameter, hence the name. It was tested in the Odet estuary in 2008, but not grid connected. The turbine weighed 7 tonnes, and sat on a gravity base in around 25 m deep water.

The larger 1 MW D10 turbine was then developed, and tested in the Fromveur Passage, Brittany from June 2015. After hackers interrupted the communications link with the turbine, it began supplying power to the grid in Ushant on 5 November 2015. It was redeployed for a third test campaign in April 2022, In October 2024, Inyanga Marine Energy took over the D10 turbine operation, securing permission to operate it until August 2028.

=== SIMEC Atlantis Energy ===
SIMEC Atlantis Energy Ltd (now Ampeak Energy) is a renewable energy company which is developing the MeyGen tidal array in the Pentland Firth between the Scottish mainland and Orkney. Since 2017, this has operated with 4× 1.5 MW tidal turbines, making it the largest tidal-stream array worldwide. The next phases could see a further 50 MW installed by 2028.

The company was founded as Atlantis Resources, and developed the 1.5 MW AR1500 turbine, a three-bladed horizontal-axis seabed mounded device, which is installed at MeyGen. They also built a smaller 500 kW AR500 turbine in Scotland, which was shipped to Japan and installed off Naru Island, part of the Gotō Islands. It reportedly generated 10 MWh in the first 10 days of operation in early 2021.

=== Sustainable Marine Energy ===
Sustainable Marine Energy Ltd (SME) was a developer of floating tidal stream turbines, founded in 2012 but went into administration in August 2023. Originally based in London, it moved to East Cowes, Isle of Wight in 2013. The company then moved its operational base to Kirkwall in Orkney in 2016. By 2017, the head office had been relocated to La Belle Esperance, a barge moored on The Shore, Leith, Edinburgh.

Their first platform, PLAT-O, was a submerged mid-water-column device, with two 50 kW Schottel SIT turbines, mounted between three buoyant hulls. It was initially tested in The Solent, before being tested at EMEC in 2016.

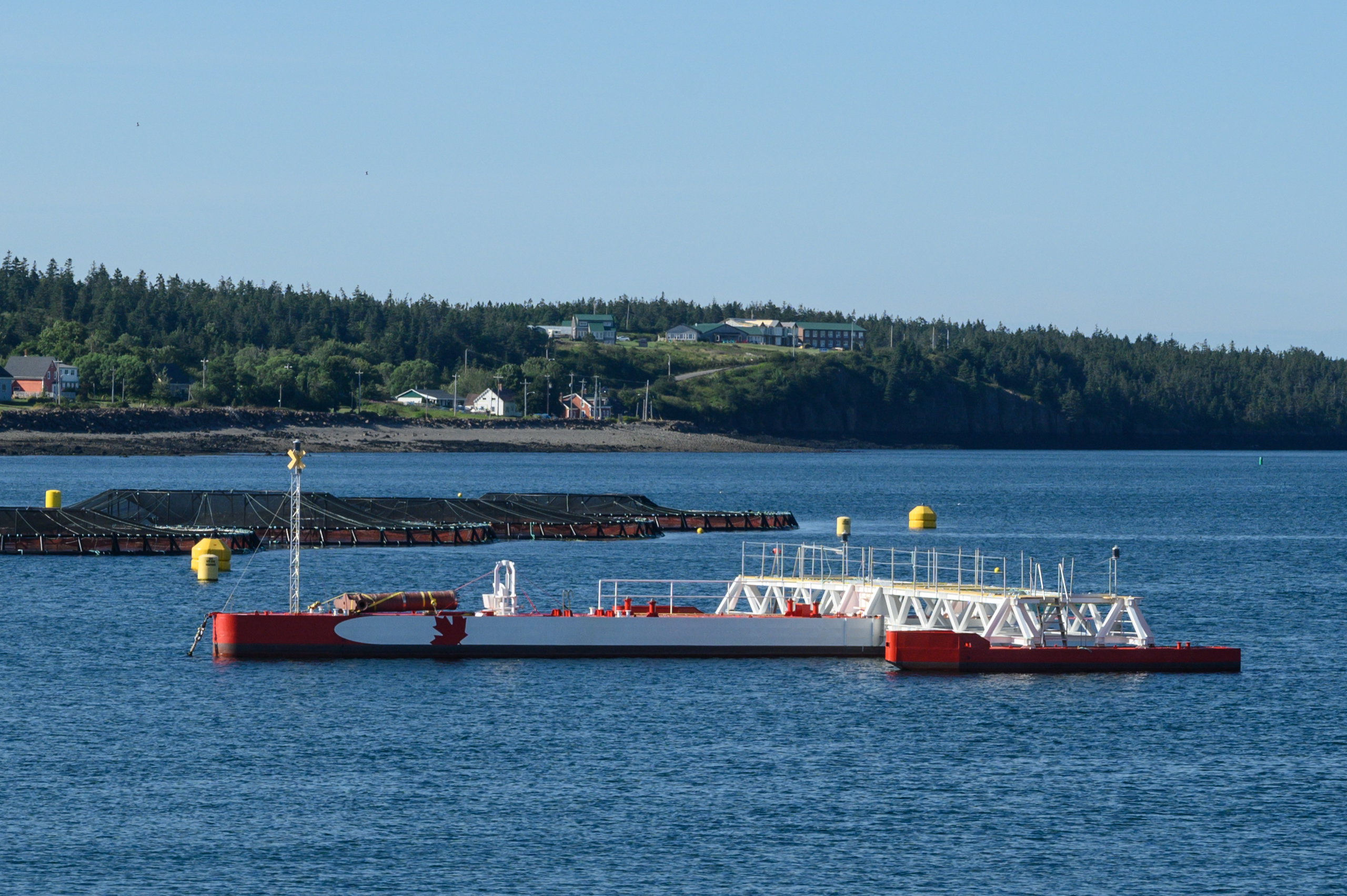
SME PLAT-I 6.4 horizontal, in-stream, floating tidal energy generator at Grand Passage site in Nova Scotia, Canada.

The floating PLAT-I 4.63 was developed for community-scale deployments in inshore waters. It had four 6.3 m diameter turbines mounted on a floating boat-like structure. It was first tested at the Falls of Lora, western Scotland in November 2017, before being shipped to Canada and tested at Grand Passage, Nova Scotia in 2018.

An upgraded PLAT-I 6.4, with six 4 m diameter rotors, totaling 420 kW, was built by A.F. Theriault & Son Ltd. in Meteghan, Nova Scotia in 2021. The turbine was tested at FORCE in the Grand Passage, delivering the first floating tidal power to the Canadian grid in April 2022.

SME developed the Pempa’q project at FORCE which was to comprise an array of the PLAT-I turbines, with up to 9 MW installed. The project received C$28.5million in funding from the Government of Canada, however it was cancelled in 2023, citing federal red tape. SME placed the turbines into storage and removed all of the equipment from the seabed. However, one of the turbines broke its moorings and washed ashore in November 2023.

In October 2022, the company split out its anchoring solutions as Swift Anchors, with the aim to focus on different technologies including Floating offshore wind.

=== Tidal Energy Ltd ===
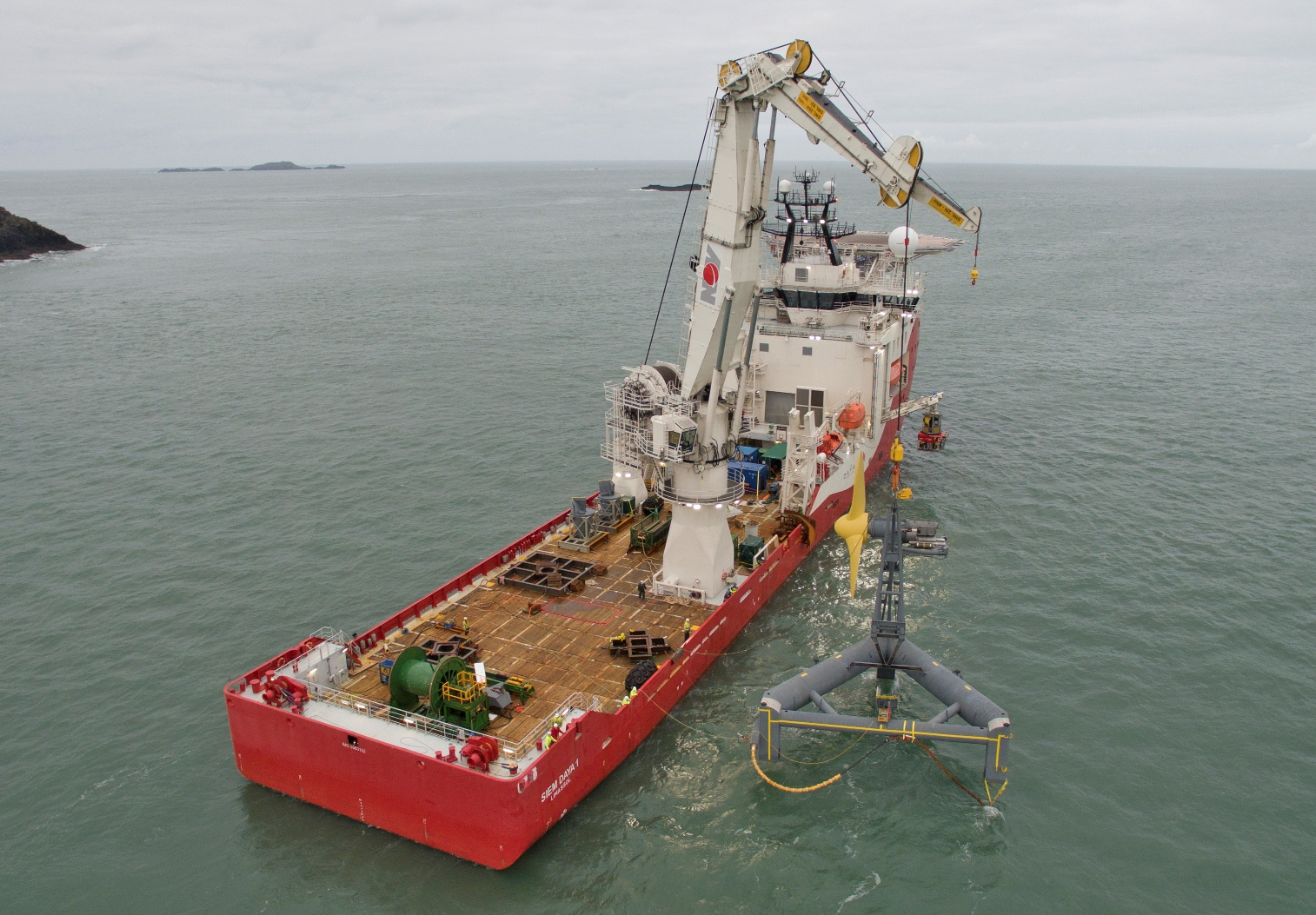
Tidal Energy Ltd - DeltaStream device installation in Ramsey Sound, Pembrokeshire in 2015

Tidal Energy Ltd (TEL) was a tidal stream developer based in Cardiff, Wales. They developed a three-bladed horizontal-axis turbine mounted on a 16 m long triangular gravity base. To increase reliability, a simple fixed-pitch blade design was used.

A 400 kW prototype was installed in Ramsey Sound, Wales in December 2015 after sitting on the quayside at Pembroke Dock for over a year. In March 2016, the turbine developed "an intermittent fault with an active sonar" followed by a mechanical defect which prevented it generating. After the company went into administration in October, the Welsh Government sought a buyer for the turbine in December 2016.

There were plans to remove the turbine as part of the Anglo-French Tidal Stream Industry Energiser Project (TIGER) project, and examine the reasons for the failures. The Ramsey Sound site was also to be redeveloped by Cambrian Offshore South West, with a new turbine of up to 1 MW installed.

The triangular base frame was designed to support three turbines, although only a single turbine was tested. Eco2 in conjunction with TEL had planned to install an array of nine devices St David's Head, to the north of Ramsey Sound.

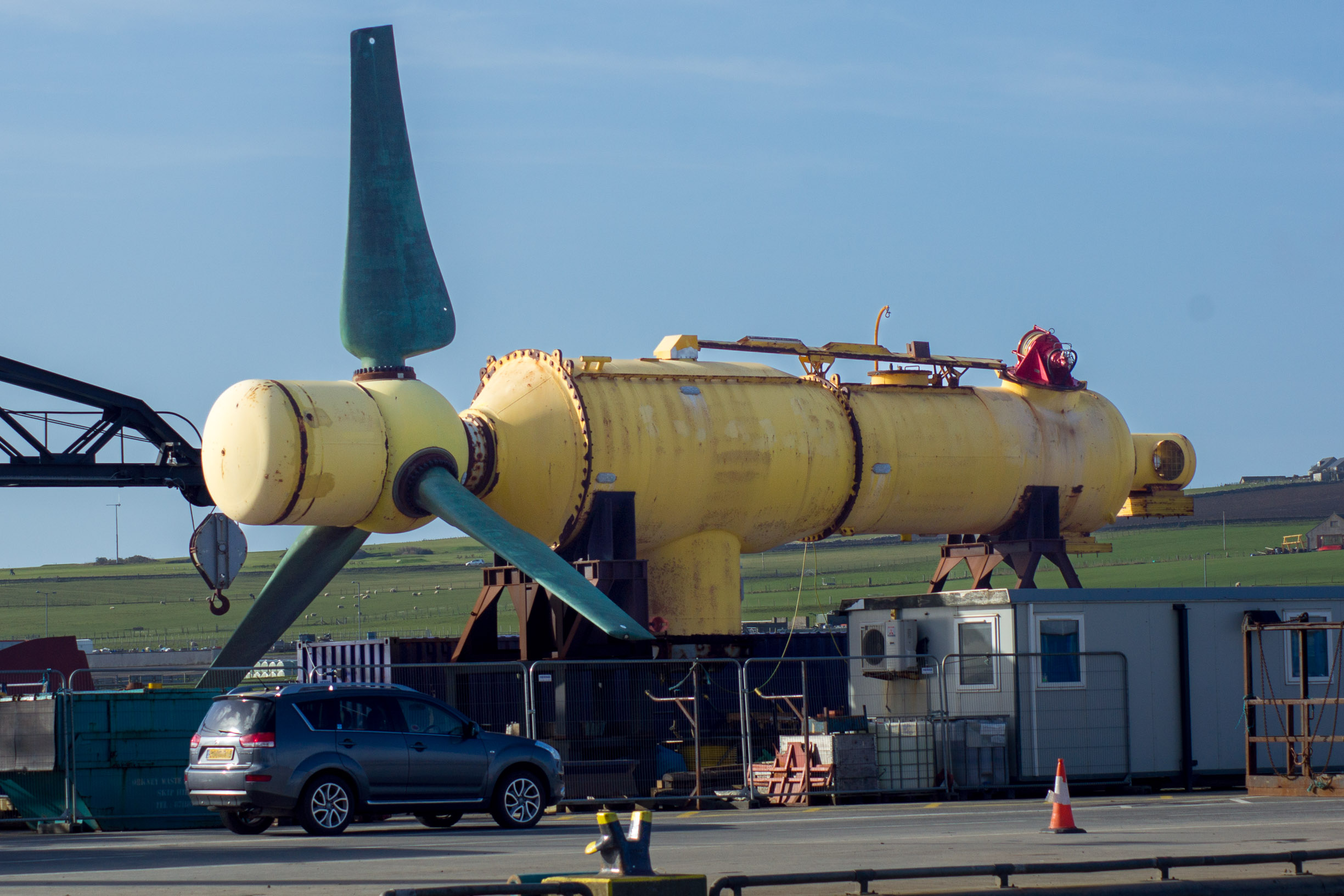
The 500 kW TGL DeepGen III tidal stream turbine at Hatston Pier, Orkney

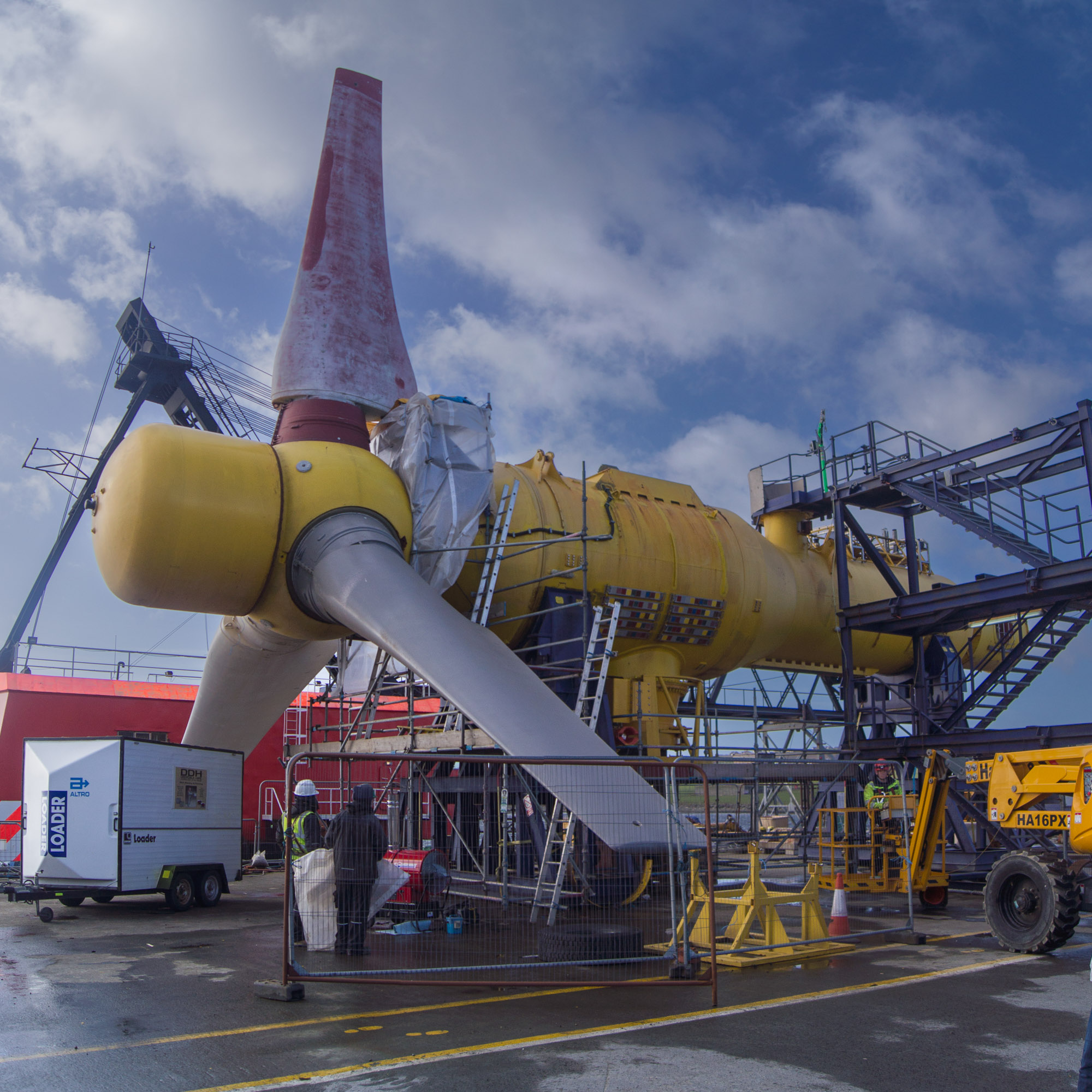
The 1 MW TGL DeepGen IV tidal stream turbine at Hatston Pier, Orkney

=== Tidal Generation Ltd ===
Tidal Generation Ltd (TGL) was a Bristol-based developer of tidal stream turbines, founded in 2005. It was acquired by Rolls-Royce, before being sold to Alstom in 2012. Then in 2015, General Electric acquired Alstom's energy division, including TGL. In 2021 French tidal developer Sabella acquired General Electric's tidal energy assets, including those developed by TGL, Rolls-Royce and Alstom.

TGL tested a 500 kW turbine at EMEC from September 2010 as part of the Deep-Gen III project. This was the first turbine installed at EMEC that was eligible for Renewables Obligation Certificates. By September 2012, it had generated over 250 MWh of electricity which was supplied to the local grid.

An upgraded 1 MW Deep-Gen IV turbine was developed while part of Rolls-Royce within the Reliable Data Acquisition Platform for Tidal (ReDAPT) project, partly funded by the Energy Technologies Institute. The turbine rotor was 18 m in diameter, mounted on a 22 m long nacelle, with a mass of under 150 t. It had cut-in, rated, and maximum flow speeds of 1 m/s, 2.7 m/s, and 5 m/s respectively.

In 2014, a 1.4 MW turbine was proposed, again with an 18 m diameter rotor. It was marketed as the Oceade™ 18 – 1.4 MW, but was never built.

The TGL turbines were a three-bladed horizontal-axis design which could yaw to face the incoming tide, driven by a thruster on the rear of the nacelle. They nacelle of the turbine was buoyant, which allowed it to towed to site then installed onto the subsea tripod foundation using a winch system operated from small workboats.

=== Tocardo ===
Tocardo BV is a Dutch tidal stream turbine developer, jointly owned by QED Naval and Hydrowing as of January 2020. The company began developing their technology in 1999. The Tocardo turbines are two-bladed horizontal-axis with direct-drive generators.

A prototype T1 turbine was tested in the sluice of the Afsluitdijk (Closure Dyke) in the Netherlands in 2008. This was 2.8 m in diameter and rated at 45 kW. In early 2015, a further three Tocardo T1 turbines were installed, each rated at 100 kW.

In 2015, five Tocardo T2 turbines were installed on the Oosterscheldekering (Eastern Scheldt storm surge barrier) also in the Netherlands. These started generating electricity to the Dutch grid in 2016. They were mounted on a frame supported by the road bridge which could rotate to lift all of the turbines out the water simultaneously. Each turbine was 5.26 m in diameter (87 m^{2} swept area) and rated at 250 kW for a total power of 1.25 MW. The project was decommissioned after eight years of operation in 2023.

In the BlueTec project a floating platform was moored near the Dutch island of Texel, with a Tocardo turbine mounted beneath it. It was initially installed in summer 2015 with a 100 kW T1 turbine, then reinstalled in early 2016 with a T2 turbine, and provided power to the local electricity grid. The turbine was launched from Den Helder, and there were plans to also test a 50 kW Schottle turbine on the platform.

Three Tocardo T1 turbines were integrated onto the 240 kW QED Naval Subhub community demonstrator platform in late 2021, with a plan to test the turbine in The Solent near Yarmouth, Isle of Wight, UK.

The next generation of Tocardo T3 turbines are planned to be used on the tidal projects by Hydrowing and Môr Energy at Morlais, Wales.

=== Verdant Power ===
Verdant Power, Inc is a developer of tidal stream turbines, based in New York, USA. They have tested turbines in the East River since 2006. An array of six 35 kW turbines supplied power to two local businesses from May 2007 to October 2008. An upgraded platform with three turbines was installed in October 2020.

=== Voith Hydro ===
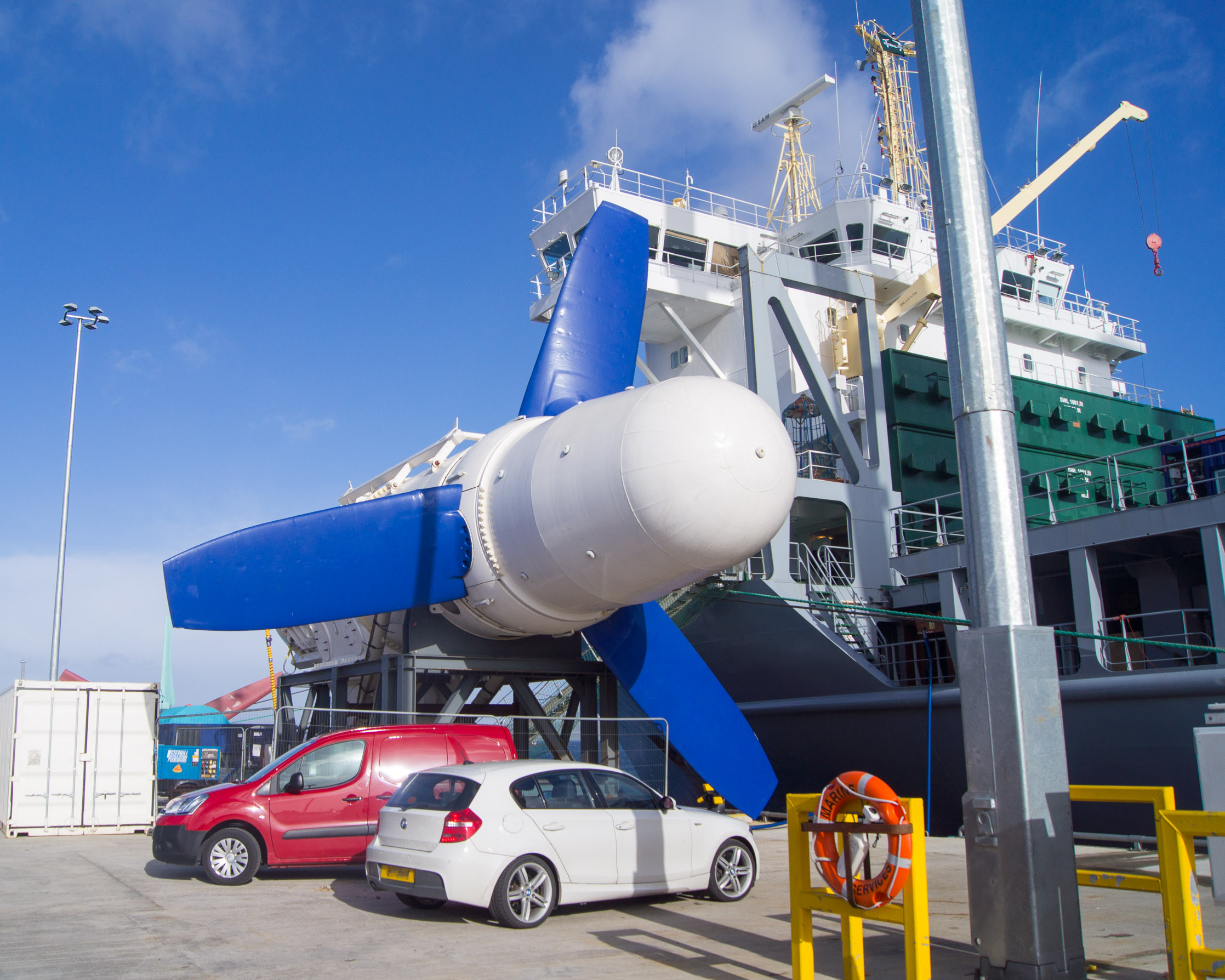
The 1MW Voith HyTide tidal stream generator sitting on Hatston Pier, Orkney

Voith Hydro Ocean Current Technologies GmbH was a joint venture between Voith Hydro and RWE Innogy that developed tidal stream turbines, however Innogy sold their stake in November 2013.

The 110 kW HyTide 110–5.3 turbine was tested in southern South Korea, near Jindo island in 2010, a 1/3rd scale prototype. This had a 5.33 m diameter rotor, 22 m^{2} swept area. The turbine was designed to be simple, with a direct-drive generator (without gearbox) and no yaw or blade pitch adjustment. It also had no dynamic seals, thus the generator was cooled by seawater. The turbine was prototype certified by Germanischer Lloyd.

A full-scale 1 MW horizontal-axis turbine was then tested at EMEC between 2013 and 2015. The HyTide 1000 had a 13 m diameter rotor (133 m^{2} swept area), and weighed around 200 tonnes. It was installed by SLA Offshore in September 2013, from the DP II vessel MV Lone.

Voith also acquired the 250 kW Islay LIMPET wave power station in 2005.

=== Zhejiang University ===
Zhejiang University has installed three tidal stream turbines to the north of Zhairuoshan Island (29°57′27.03″N 122°4′57.31″E), in the Zhoushan archipelago. A 60 kW turbine was installed in 2014, a 120 kW turbine deployed in 2015, and a 600 kW turbine in 2018.

== List of grid-connected tidal stream generators ==
Over the years, many different tidal stream turbines have been deployed and tested at sea, and have delivered power to the local electricity grid. A non-exhaustive list is given in the table below, along with other notable devices. As most of these were development and test versions, they were removed for periods of time for maintenance or upgrades.

Manufacturer & Turbine	Turbine Power (MW)	Country	Location	Coordinates	Comm	Decom	Ref
MCT, SeaFlow [not grid connected]	0.3	UK, England	Lynmouth, Devon	51°15′22″N 3°47′14″W	2003–06	2006-01	
Hammerfest Strøm, HS300	0.3	Norway	Kvalsundet	70°30′40.32″N 23°56′38.4″E	2004-01	2011-01	
OpenHydro	0.25	UK Scotland	EMEC, Fall of Warness	59°9′27″N 2°49′32.74″W	2006	yes	
Verdant Power ×6	0.035	USA, New York	East River	40°45′24.66″N 73°57′4.36″W	2007-05	2008–10	
Tocardo, T1 prototype	0.045	Netherlands	Afsluitdijk sluice	52°56′06″N 5°02′38″E	2008		
MCT, SeaGen	1.2	UK, Northern Ireland	Strangford Narrows	54°22′7.2″N 5°32′45.8″W	2008–12	2018-08	
Orbital, SR250	0.25	UK Scotland	EMEC	59°8′39.48″N 2°48′55.68″W	2011-01	2013-08	
Hammerfest Strøm, HS1000	1	UK Scotland	EMEC		2012-02	2015-01	
Sabella D10	1	France	Fromveur Passage, Brittany	48°26′54″N 5°1′48″W	2015-04	Operational	
Nova Innovation, Nova 30	0.03	UK Scotland	Bluemull Sound, Shetland	60°41′59.6″N 0°58′58.1″W	2014-04	2016	
Tocardo, T1 ×3	0.045	Netherlands	Afsluitdijk sluice	52°56′10″N 5°02′42″E	2015-02		
Tocardo, T1 then T2	0.1	Netherlands	Texel, Wadden Sea	53°00′N 4°48′E	2015		
OpenHydro ×2 [never grid connected]	0.5	France	Paimpol–Bréhat, Brittany	48°50′N 3°01′W	2016	2017	
Zhoushan tidal power station	0.4	China	Zhoushan, Zhejiang	30°8′15.48″N 122°10′1.25″E	2016	Operational	
Zhoushan tidal power station	0.6	China	Zhoushan, Zhejiang	30°8′15.48″N 122°10′1.25″E	2016	Operational	
Nova Innovation, M100	0.1	UK Scotland	Bluemull Sound, Shetland	60°41′59.6″N 0°58′58.1″W	2016-03	2023-06	
Nova Innovation, M100	0.1	UK Scotland	Bluemull Sound, Shetland	60°41′59.6″N 0°58′58.1″W	2016-07	2023-06	
Orbital, SR2000	2	UK Scotland	EMEC	59°8′39.48″N 2°48′55.68″W	2016-10	2018-08	
OpenHydro	2	Canada	Grand Passage, Bay of Fundy		2016-11	2017-06	
Andritz Hydro Hammerfest, HS1000 Mk1 ×3	1.5	UK Scotland	Meygen	58°39′30″N 3°7′30″W	2016-12	Operational	
SIMEC Atlantis, AR1500	1.5	UK Scotland	Meygen	58°39′30″N 3°7′30″W	2017-02	Operational	
Nova Innovation, M100	0.1	UK Scotland	Bluemull Sound, Shetland	60°41′59.6″N 0°58′58.1″W	2017-07	2023-06	
OpenHydro	2	Canada	Grand Passage, Bay of Fundy		2018-07	2018-09	
Zhoushan tidal power station	0.3	China	Zhoushan, Zhejiang	30°8′15.48″N 122°10′1.25″E	2018-12	Operational	
Zhoushan tidal power station	0.4	China	Zhoushan, Zhejiang	30°8′15.48″N 122°10′1.25″E	2018-12	Operational	
Magallanes Renovables, ATIR	1.5	UK Scotland	EMEC	59°8′29.08″N 2°49′6.5″W	2019-02	Operational (Note: Off-site from 2020 to 2001 to 2021–04)	
HydroQuest, OceanQuest	1.0	France	Paimpol–Bréhat, Brittany	48°50′N 3°01′W	2019-04	2020-12	
Verdant Power, Gen5 ×3	0.07	USA, New York	East River	40°45′24.66″N 73°57′4.36″W	2020-10	Operational	
Nova Innovation, M100-D	0.1	UK Scotland	Bluemull Sound, Shetland	60°41′59.6″N 0°58′58.1″W	2020-10	Operational	
SIMEC Atlantis, AR500	0.5	Japan	Naru Island	32°50′N 128°54′E	2021-02	2023-12 (Note: Turbine was upgraded and redeployed in February 2025 as the AR1100)	
Orbital, O2	2	UK Scotland	EMEC	59°8′39.48″N 2°48′55.68″W	2021-10	Operational	
Sustainable Marine Energy, PLAT-I 6.4	0.42	Canada	Grand Passage, Bay of Fundy	45°20′36″N 64°23′34″W	2022-04	2023-05	
Nova Innovation, M100-D ×2	0.1	UK Scotland	Bluemull Sound, Shetland	60°41′59.6″N 0°58′58.1″W	2023-01	Operational	
Proteus Marine Renewables, AR1100	1.1	Japan	Naru Island	32°50′N 128°54′E	2025-02	Operational	
