= Rhea (name) =

Rhea is a given name, surname, and the name of figures from Greco-Roman mythology and history.

As a given name, it is generally, but not always, pronounced (/ˈriːə/; REE-ə), and was originally the name of Rhea, a Titan in Greek mythology.

As a surname, it is generally pronounced (/reɪ/; RAY), and is of Scottish origin.

== Given name ==
- Rhea Anastas (born 1969), American art historian
- Rhea Bailey (born 1983), English actress
- Rhea Belgrave (born 1991), Trinidadian footballer
- Rhea Boyd, American paediatrician
- Rhea Carmi (born 1942), Israeli artist
- Rhea Chakraborty (born 1992), Indian actress
- Rhea Chiles (1930–2015), First Lady of the State of Florida
- Rhea Clyman (1904–1981), Canadian journalist
- Rhea Dimaculangan (born 1991), Filipino volleyball player
- Rhea Durham (born 1978), American model
- Rhea Fairbairn (1890–1953), Canadian tennis player
- Rhea Galanaki (born 1947), Greek author
- Rhea Lydia Graham (born 1952), American researcher
- Rhea Haines (1894–1964), American actress
- Rhea Harder (born 1976), German actress
- Rhea Kapoor (born 1987), Indian producer
- Rhea Kohan, American writer
- Rhea Law, American lawyer
- Rhea Litré (born 1984), American singer
- Rhea Maheshwari (born 1993), Indian-New Zealand artist
- Rhea Mitchell (1890–1957), American actress and screenwriter
- Rhea Moss-Christian (born 1974), Marshallese manager
- Rhea Norwood (born 2001), English actress
- Rhea Paul, American psychologist
- Rhea Perlman (born 1948), American actress
- Rhea Pillai (born 1965), British model
- Rhea Raj (born 2000), Indian-American singer
- Rhea Ripley (born 1996), Australian professional wrestler
- Rhea Santos (born 1979), Filipino broadcaster
- Rhea Seehorn (born 1972), American actress; non-standard pronunciation "Ray"
- Rhea Seddon (born 1947), American astronaut
- Rhea Sharma (born 1995), Indian television actress
- Rhea G. Sikes (1922–2019), American television producer
- Rhea Silberta (1900–1959), Yiddish composer
- Rhea Singha, Indian model and beauty pageant titleholder
- Rhea Mazumdar Singhal (born 1980), Indian entrepreneur
- Rhea Suh (born 1970), American government official
- Rhea May Taleb (born 2001), Lebanese footballer
- Rhea Tregebov (born 1953), Canadian poet, novelist, and writer
- Rhea Woltman (1928–2021), American pilot

== Surname ==
- Arnt O. Rhea (1852-1937), American politician
- Caroline Rhea (born 1964), stand-up comedian, television actress and host
- Hortense Rhéa (1844–1899), French actress
- James Rhea (1791–1812), American soldier
- John Rhea (1753–1832), United States Congressman
- John Stockdale Rhea (1855–1924), U.S. Congressman from Kentucky
- Karen Rhea, American mathematics educator
- La Julia Rhea (1908–92), American opera singer
- Lady Rhea, a Wiccan high priestess
- Lois Rhea, American composer
- Russ Rhea (born 1962) American journalist
- Slater Rhea, American singer-songwriter; TV performer
- Timothy Rhea (born 1967), American conductor, and Director of Bands at Texas A&M University
- William Francis Rhea (1858–1931), U.S. Congressman from Virginia

== Mythological figures ==
- Rhea (mythology), a Titan in Greek mythology
- Rhea Silvia, in Roman mythology the mother of the twins Romulus and Remus
- Rhea (mother of Aventinus), mother of Aventinus by Hercules
- Rhea or Riadh, Celtic mythological hero

== Fictional characters ==
- Rhea of the Cöos, a character in Stephen King's Dark Tower novels
- Rhea Jones, a DC comics character
- Rhea (Supergirl), a character in the TV series Supergirl
- Rhea, a character in Fire Emblem: Three Houses and Fire Emblem Warriors: Three Hopes
- Rhea Jarrell, a character in Succession

== See also ==
- Rhea (disambiguation)
- Ray (surname)
- Rhesa
- Riya
