= Saltire Prize =

Scottish technology prize for wave and tidal energy

The Saltire Prize, named after the flag of Scotland, was a national award for advances in the commercial development of marine energy.

Announced in 2014, to be considered for the £10 million award, teams had to demonstrate, in Scottish waters, a commercially viable wave or tidal stream energy technology "that achieves the greatest volume of electrical output over the set minimum hurdle of 100 GWh over a continuous 2-year period using only the power of the sea."

The Saltire Prize was open to any individual, team or organisation from across the world who believed they had wave or tidal energy technology capable of fulfilling the challenge. Applications could be submitted between March 2010 and January 2015.

The funding was later allocated to the Saltire Tidal Energy Challenge Fund as there were no eligible entries for the original prize.

== Additional prizes ==
- The Saltire Prize Lecture — delivered at the Scottish Renewables Marine Conference every September, it focused on the challenges in converting our world lead in wave and tidal energy to an industry of commercial scale, and in securing the economic, environmental and social benefits that this industry can bring. The lecture was designed to promote knowledge exchange between academics, industry, financiers and government.
- The Saltire Prize Medal — created to recognise outstanding contributions to the development of marine renewable energy. The Medal was awarded every March at the Scottish Renewables Annual Conference, Exhibition and Dinner.
- The Junior Saltire Prize — launched in 2011, this was aimed at primary and secondary school pupils and was designed to help raise awareness of the opportunities that Scotland has to exploit its marine renewables potential. It was sponsored by Skills Development Scotland and awards are presented to teams in three age groups: Primary 5-7 (age 8-12), Secondary 1-3 (age 11-15), and Secondary 4-6 (age 14-18).
- A Saltire Prize-sponsored doctorate — in collaboration with the Energy Technology Partnership (ETP). This was announced in August 2012. The research would consider how marine energy projects can be designed to maximise economic energy production while protecting the environment.
- Power of the Sea — a one-off junior photography competition sponsored by the Saltire Prize, aimed at raising awareness of the natural environment and its potential for marine energy. In December 2012, four young photographers from Scottish primary schools were selected by renowned Scottish photographer, David Eustace, as the national winners.

The Junior Saltire Prize and the sponsored doctorate were discontinued in 2016, having cost £60,000 and £48,418 respectively.

=== Saltire Prize Medal ===
In 2011 the inaugural Saltire Prize Medal was awarded to Professor Stephen Salter, who led the team which designed the Salter's Duck device in the 1970s. Richard Yemm, inventor of the Pelamis Wave Energy Converter, was awarded the medal in 2012. Professor Peter Fraenkel, MBE, a pioneer for the development of marine turbines, won the 2013 medal. The 2014 medal went to Allan Thomson, founder of Aquamarine Power. No further medals have been awarded.

== History ==
When it was first announced in 2008 by then First Minister of Scotland Alex Salmond it was the world's largest ever single prize for innovation in marine renewable energy. The prize was overseen by the Challenge Committee. Saltire Prize policy was the responsibility of the Offshore Renewables Policy Team in the Scottish Government's Energy and Climate Change Directorate.

When it launched, the criteria included:

- Open to any individual, team, or organsisation, from anywhere in the world, however projects had to be located in Scottish waters.
- Using the energy from waves and/or tidal streams to provide electrical output. Tidal barrages, offshore wind, osmotic power, ocean thermal energy conversion, and marine biomass were all excluded.
- Individual devices or arrays of multiple devices (comprising one or more technology) could be used, provided they were part of a discrete project with a single electricity connection point.

Registration was open between June 2012 and January 2015. The winner would be whoever generated the most electricity within a continuous 2-year period before the deadline of June 2017, subject to a minimum hurdle of 100 GW. The winner was to be announced in July 2017.

=== Competitors ===
There were five entrants for the Saltire Prize, in a phase of the contest that ran until 2017, two wave energy and three tidal-stream:

- Pelamis Wave Power, although the company went into administration in November 2014.
- Aquamarine Power secured a 40 MW lease off the north-west coast of Lewis for their Oyster wave energy device, although this company also went into administration in 2015 before deploying any devices there.
- ScottishPower Renewables planned to deploy a 95 MW tidal array at the Ness of Duncansby site, in the Pentland Firth, however this project never progressed.
- West Islay Tidal was a proposed 30 MW project by DP Energy in the Sound of Islay, but again this project never progressed.
- The MeyGen tidal array developed by Atlantis Resources (now SAE Renewables) successfully installed phase 1a comprising four 1.5 MW turbines by February 2017 and was operational by April 2018.

By March 2015, it was clear that the prize was not going to be claimed, however the Saltire Prize Challenge Committee considered other options to drive innovation in the wave and tidal power sectors in Scotland. In February 2015, the Saltire Tidal Energy Challenge Fund was announced.

== Saltire Tidal Energy Challenge Fund ==
The Saltire Tidal Energy Challenge Fund was set up in February 2015 to provide support to the Scottish tidal power sector, complementing the funding for Wave Energy Scotland. The fund was to support capital cost of developing innovations to reduce the cost of tidal energy, for projects to be deployed in Scotland before March 2020. These had to demonstrate value and the potential for positive social and economic benefit to Scotland.

In August 2019, Orbital Marine Power was the first recipient of the fund, and awarded £3.4 million towards developing the Orbital O2 turbine.

In March 2020, SIMEC Atlantis Energy (now SAE Renewables) was awarded £1.5 million towards developing a sub-sea hub to connect multiple turbines at the MeyGen project.

== See also ==
- List of engineering awards
- Crown Estate
- Marine Scotland
- Renewables Obligation
- Scottish Adjacent Waters Boundaries Order 1999
- Tidal stream generator
- Wave farm
