= RIIA =

RIIA may mean:

- Chatham House, also known as the Royal Institute of International Affairs;
- Resource initialization is acquisition, concept from computer science
- rIIA the A cistron of the T4 rII system a gene in the T4 virus.

== See also ==
- RIA (disambiguation)
- RIAA
