= Aquanator =

The Aquanator was a small-scale tidal-power device, a device which uses rows of hydrofoils to generate electricity from water currents. It was invented by Australian Michael Perry.

== History ==
The Aquanator was announced in 2004. A contract to test the device was signed with Country Energy on 26 September 2004.

The test site was located at 38.5163°S 145.3648°E. In 2006 it was connected to the national grid. The device test site was decommissioned in May 2008 by owner Atlantis Resources.

== Description ==
The Aquanator used ocean current to produce electricity. It was intended to generate power even with a small flow of 1.5 knots. The test device had a capacity of 5 kW. The aquanator's slow moving hydrofoil design was meant to provide a green energy source which would not harm ocean life as faster moving turbines might.

== Economy ==
At the time, the Aquanator was meant to be cheaper than diesel fuels, with costs about the same amount as wind power and one sixth the price of diesel-powered systems.

== See also ==
- Tidal power
