= Rea =

REA or Rea may refer to:

== Places ==
- Rea, Lombardy, in Italy
- Rea, Missouri, United States
- Rea River, in Fiordland, New Zealand
- River Rea, a river in Birmingham, England
- River Rea, Shropshire, a river in Shropshire, England
- Rea, Hungarian name of Reea village in Totești Commune, Hunedoara County, Romania

== Acronyms ==
- Railway Express Agency (1918–1975), a defunct American package delivery service
- Ralph Engelstad Arena, ice hockey venue at the University of North Dakota in Grand Forks, North Dakota
- Reactive arthritis, inflammatory arthritis that develops in response to an infection in another part of the body
- Real Academia Española, the Royal Spanish Academy regulating the Spanish language.
- Reggio Emilia approach, an educational philosophy
- Religious Education Association, American scholarly organization
- Renewable Energy Association, British trade association
- Research & Education Association, American publisher of test preparation materials and study guides
- Research Executive Agency, former name of the European Research Executive Agency
- Resident Evil: Afterlife (2010), an American horror film
- Resident Evil: Apocalypse (2004), an American horror film
- Resources, Events, Agents, a theoretical model for computerized accounting
- Rethymniaki Enosi Athliton, a Greek women's association football club
- Rosenergoatom, (Russian: Росэнергоатом) is the Russian nuclear power station operations subsidiary of Atomenergoprom.
- Rules Enabling Act (1934), US law empowering Federal courts to create "Rules of Civil Procedure"
- Rural Electrification Act (1936), US law providing for rural electrification
- Rural Electrification Administration (1932–1994), former name of the Rural Utilities Service, a US government agency
- Restrictive Early Action, a type of early action in American college admissions
- Rapid Equilibrium Assumption, a method for solving Stiff ODEs

== Other ==
- Rea, synonym of the plant subgenus Sonchus subg. Dendroseris
- Rea (name), including a list of people and characters with the name
- Rea (album)
- Mens rea (Latin for 'guilty mind'), a legal term
- Rea Award for the Short Story, an annual American and Canadian literary award
- Rhea (bird), sometimes misspelled rea
- Rea Magnet Wire, manufacturer of a broad range of magnet wire and other specialty wire
- REA Group, the parent company of property website realestate.com.au

== See also ==
- Riya, a feminine given name
- Rhea (disambiguation)
- RIA (disambiguation)
- Rio (disambiguation)
- Ríos (disambiguation)
