= R1A =

R1A may refer to:

- Haplogroup R1a
- Line R1a, a planning name for Line 5 (Shanghai Metro)
- R1A, a class of Group R
- R1A, a Canadian postal code assigned to Selkirk, Manitoba
- Robonaut 1A, a version of Robonaut 1

== See also ==
- RIA (disambiguation)
