= Rhesa =

Rhesa is a given name and surname, likely deriving from the minor figure in the New Testament.

== Notable people with given name Rhesa ==
- Rhesa (New Testament), a minor figure in the New Testament
- Rhesa Barksdale (born 1944), American judge
- Rhesa Foster (born 1998), American long jumper

== Notable people with surname Rhesa ==
- Ludwig Rhesa (1776–1840), Prussian academic

== See also ==
- Rhea (name)
- Rhys
