= Richard Yemm =

British inventor

Richard Yemm is the British inventor of the Pelamis Wave Energy Converter and was director of the former Pelamis Wave Power, a company he founded in Edinburgh in 1998. In 2014 he co-founded a new company, Quoceant, who are engineering consultants specialising in marine energy and technology innovation.

== Biography ==
Yemm studied mechanical engineering at the University of Edinburgh from 1985 to 1989, graduating with a first class honours degree. As an undergraduate, he was also awarded a Half Blue for sailing in 1986–87 by the Edinburgh University Sports Union, denoting performance to a high standard. He completed his PhD in 1994 under Professor Stephen Salter, former Saltire Prize medallist and inventor of the Edinburgh duck wave energy device.

He went on to pursue a career as a self-employed design and development engineer on renewable energy projects, gaining experience in the wind energy industry. He invented the Pelamis Wave Energy Converter for generating electricity from marine waves, and established Ocean Power Delivery Ltd in 1998 to develop the product. The company is now called Pelamis Wave Power Ltd. Yemm was CEO until August 2007, raising substantial investment and gaining commercial orders from 2005 onwards. He then became CTO of the company.

Yemm was chairman of the Board of Scottish Renewables trade association for over five years, and is active in promoting renewable and wave energy.

== Recognition ==
In March 2012 Yemm was presented with the Saltire Prize medal by Scottish First Minister Alex Salmond. The chief executive of Scottish Renewables, Niall Stuart, said, "Richard Yemm will undoubtedly be looked upon as one of the most influential people to the development of Scotland's marine industry; from the drawing board to grid connected devices and making important steps to commercial scale projects." Yemm was elected a Fellow of the Royal Academy of Engineering in 2018.
