= Tidal farm =

Group of tidal stream generators used for production of electric power

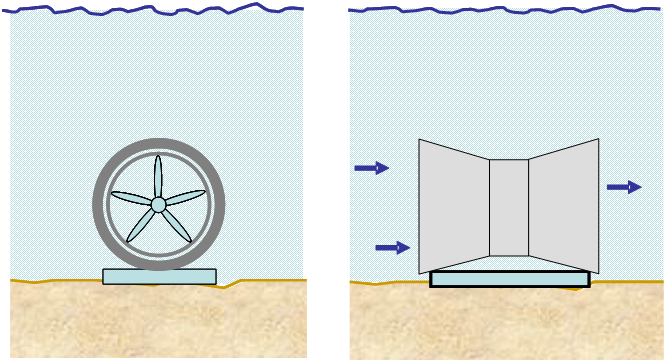
Sea Bed Turbine

A tidal farm is a group of tidal stream generators used for production of electric power. The potential of tidal farms is limited by the number of suitable sites across the globe as there are niche requirements to make a tidal farm cost effective and environmentally conscious.

== Research and development ==
Tidal farms are a relatively new form of renewable energy. There is a lot of investment going into the development of tidal farms as well as looking at their long term impacts and use cases.

In 2016 a tidal farm was installed 16 miles off of the coast of Brittany, France. It was designed to demonstrate the potential of connected tidal turbines. However, the project failed in 2017 due to corrosion and both turbines have been removed.

In Iran there has been interest in development of tidal stream energy due to its stability. Faculty of Civil Engineering at the university of Tarbiat Modares University have identified potential sites of interest for these farms. Locations include the Persian Gulf, the Oman Sea, Khowran Straight, Hengam Island and Greater Tunb Island. Cost of energy, power output, tariff rates and expected return on investments have also been factors analyzed and studied by the university research group.

In the Bristol Channel there has been research on the potential environmental impacts of tidal farms. The study concluded that the proper environmental evaluation needs to be done for each site.

== Technology ==
A mathematical optimization approach is used to design turbine farm layouts. These models are used to determine if a potential site has suitable geography, a minimal environmental impact and is economically viable. Through research and development, factors such as the number of turbines, location of turbines and overall farm profit could be accurately tested and predicted.

Tidal Farms utilize tidal stream generators that are grouped together to produce electricity. These generators use the moving tides to turn turbines that are very similar to the wind turbines used on land. The power of the ocean and the turbine's advanced technology guarantee a much more predictable energy output than regular wind turbines. The turbines are usually located in areas with high tidal activity in order for the generators to be as efficient as possible. What makes tidal farms unique is that they are set up in groups to allow much more energy production. The generators are connected to substations on shore to transform voltage from high to low, or low to high. These generators can be semi-submersible or fixed into the sea floor. The turbines that would be used would be very slow moving due to the density of the water, this is very beneficial to aquatic life because fish would be able to freely pass through without being in danger of dying. Some turbines can also be used in irrigation canals, rivers, and dam whether the flow of water is fast or slow.

== Leaders in Practice ==
Scotland is one of the main leaders in the effort to utilize tidal energy as an alternative energy resource. In 2012, Scottish Power installed a 30 ft. turbine off of the Orkney Islands after preliminary testing of the new technology. Today, Scotland continues to lead the world in tidal farms. Scottish company Orbital Marine Power boasts the powerful tidal turbines, including a major project off of the coast of the Orkney. The Orbital O2 turbine can generate 2MW of energy and was installed in 2021.

The company Ocean Flow used Siemens technology to design a semi-submersible turbine. The models created have proven to be able to withstand sea conditions excellently. The company claims its model creates less disturbances to its surrounding ecosystem, and costs less to deploy. A key feature to this model's set up is the platform that the turbine rests on. It was developed at Newcastle University School of Marine Science and Technology in 2006. The Platform is suitable to withstand harsh conditions in deep depth of the ocean. Senior development engineer at Ocean Flow, Mark Knos, commented on the project and stated that they had created a 1/40th scale model to test and a 1/10 scale model as well. Both models were tested and have provided promising results.

== Tidal Farm Generation in North America ==
North America has fewer tidal power stations than any other comparable geographical area, in terms of GDP or population. Tidal power has been estimated to be able to account for fifteen percent of the United States' power consumption if harnessed correctly. The first tidal installation in North America to connect to a power grid was laid down in 2012, in Cobscook Bay, Maine by the Ocean Renewable Power Company. The preliminary device generates 180 Kilowatts at full capacity. Plans to install two more devices were shelved as of 2013. Tidal generators were installed in 2009 by OpenHydro and Emera in the Bay of Fundy. These tidal generators suffered damage, losing several blades in the process, due to the powerful tides in the Bay. In the autumn of 2016 a joint venture by the same two companies successfully placed a 2-Megawatt tidal generator in the Bay of Fundy, of which Cobscook Bay is a constituent area. The successful integration of the new tidal generators to local power stations, and the connected power grid supplies an estimated 150 to 200 homes per day.

== Types ==
• Semi Submersible Turbines is a more expensive turbine but in the long run it is cheaper and is more cost efficient. The turbines are connecting to a stationary post and the turbine generator can be raised and lowered anytime for maintenance.

• Horizontal Axis Turbines closely resemble wind turbines. The blades spin around a central axis that is parallel to the direction of flow.

• The blades on a Vertical Axis Turbine rotate around a central axis that is perpendicular to the direction of flow and is typically suspended from the surface of the water. One advantage of this model is the efficacy regardless of the direction of movement of the water.

• Oscillating Generators have a hydrofoil attached to a lever arm which rises and falls as the water moves over it.

• Tidal Kites are a type of generator that a fastened to the ocean floor with a cable and allowed a large range of motion to move in the water.

• Archimedes screw generators spin as the water moves through the shape of the screw. They are particularly effective in tidal areas with lower water levels.

== Problems ==
One of the few environmental unknowns about tidal farms is the threat they may pose to the plant life in the areas that the turbines would be set up. But by having the blades turn at a slower than normal speed wind turbines can eliminate some of the potential environmental problems. Another problem that can occur is making the turbines water tight to prevent seawater from corrosion the metal parts inside the turbine.

=== Cost ===
One of the major drawbacks of tidal farms at the moment is the relatively high cost compared to other forms of renewable energy. The electricity produced by tidal farms can cost anywhere from 7 to 14 times more than wind energy. Tidal farms are also currently accompanied by a high investment cost. Due to the unique characteristics of each site, extensive research and optimization needs to go into the design of each turbine array to maximize the potential power output. Some of the main factors that can vary from site to site include depth, the slope of the ocean floor and speed of the water's flow. These natural factors have an impact on the type of generator used and how they are arranged.

Another cost associated with tidal farms is maintenance. While most maintenance is routine and carried out one or twice a year, emergency maintenance can become costly if large machinery, such as a crane, needs to be used to fix a failure.

=== Effects on ocean geography and tidal patterns ===
Tidal farms present many possible environmental and ecological changes to the environment they are placed in. The structures of these farms produce changes in tidal patterns, sediment flow, and water column turbulence. Tidal patterns can be affected in different ways depending on the structure of the farm itself. The structure is referring to the size and cross-sectional area because the number of blades or the load that is put on the farm does not make much of a difference on the overall height of the water. These effects can be seen to lower both the high tide and low tides which means that the water level will be lower in total. The number of blades and load on the system however does affect the tidal range vastly. Tidal range can be reduced up to 42% with observations of the densest farms which can cause destruction to 32% of the areas around them, but it can be controlled. Damage can be reduced to 19% by using a two-rotor spaced turbine and only 5.4% with five-rotor spaced turbines. This is done by spreading the water's work over a large surface area on the turbine itself to mitigate the alteration of the flow in the water column.

Sediment flow is affected by the introduction of tidal farms to an area. Not only does it create turbulence that moves the sediment, but it changes the ecosystem around it. By moving more sediment into areas that did not gain much before, places like grass beds could be wiped out by being covered in sediment. The geography on the ocean floor would be changed by the new sediment flow patterns because of the new turbulence. New things like sandbars could form around the farms causing even more of an impact to the surrounding environment by influencing more changes than originally expected.

The water column also faces multiple chances since the force it transfers through turbulence is being absorbed by the tidal farms. Waves would be directly affected by the reduced energy behind the water causing them to be weaker which too could destroy multiple ecosystems. There would also be an effect on the inter-tidal zones with there being less turbulence which many species like fish and crabs use for sustenance and survival. Other things like noise and electromagnetic fields also pose problems for the environment, but not to the scale that the last effects had on the geography and life in an ecosystem.

=== Effects on ecology ===
The prime placement of tidal farms occurs in tidal barrages, marshes, lagoons and other intertidal bodies of waters most commonly home to migratory wetland birds. The placement of tidal farms raises the water levels to a point where the feeding areas of the birds are submerged. With the loss of feeding areas, mortality rates increase. Furthermore, studies were conducted by University of Exeter faculty for wetland birds in the Solway Firth, UK. These studies concluded that the effect of certain types of tidal farms are negligible. The impacts of tidal farms on water foul habitats in the Solway Firth were found to be relatively low, even for the largest case. The study highlighted that current installations with similar capacities as the simulations had a lower loss of intertidal area than that of its computer-generated counterpart . One conclusion reached was that future studies should focus on the vulnerability of an individual species, as compared to the effect on maritime birds as a whole.

The construction of tidal barrages within a bay, inlet, or estuary is one of the few cases where inter species relations were universally affected. The retention of tidal water alters the timetable of species which dominate the upper to intermediate shore habitats. Simultaneously the lower shore remains submerged for longer periods of time. The resulting forced ecosystem is disruptive to the majority of species present, with the exception of fish whom are tidal feeders. The extended periods of high tide allow for greater foraging opportunity, hence a growth in population can be observed in these cases.

The structures of larger tidal barrages alter the scour and deposition in their respective habitats. Scour and deposition refers to the movement and exchange of sediment along the floor of a water body. The U.S. Army Engineer Research and Development Center in Vicksburg, Mississippi stated that the interruption of natural sediment deposits directly led to an increased mortality rate of seabed grass, as the shoot could not properly grow in the altered seafloor. This would be even more devastating for benthic life which resides under the ocean floor since they are easily affected by changes in the flow over the bottom of the ocean. It would be hard to prevent this too since these organisms are not easily relocated since they are so sensitive to changes in their atmosphere.

== See also ==
- List of tidal power stations
- Tidal power
- Development of tidal stream generators
- Wave farm
- Wind Farm
- Dam
- Tide
