= Rhea (pipeline) =

Rhea

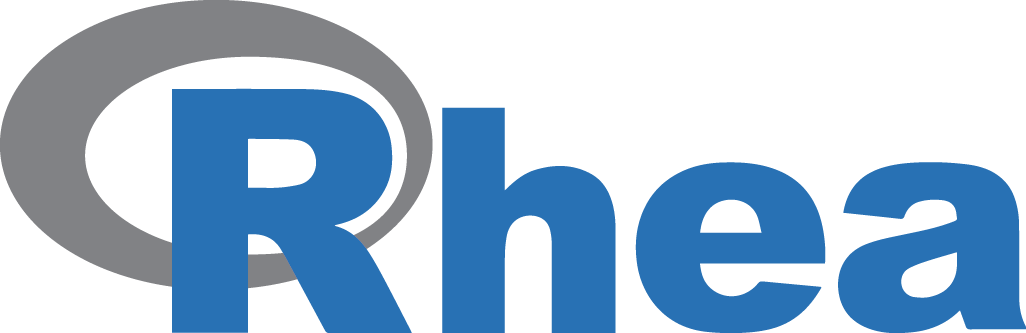
- Developer(s): Ilias Lagkouvardos, Sandra Fischer, Neeraj Kumar, Thomas Clavel
- Initial release: November 16, 2016
- Stable release: 1.1.0
- Written in: R
- Operating system: Windows, macOS, Ubuntu, Fedora, Red Hat Linux, openSUSE
- License: MIT License
- Website: https://lagkouvardos.github.io/Rhea/

Rhea is a bioinformatic pipeline written in R language for the analysis of microbial profiles. It was released during the end of 2016 and it is publicly available through a GitHub repository.

Starting with an Operational taxonomic unit (OTU) table, the pipeline contains scripts that perform the following common analytical steps:

1. Normalization of the OTU table
2. Calculation of the alpha diversity for each sample
3. Calculation of beta diversity and visualization of the results with PCoA
4. Taxonomic binning
5. Statistical testing
6. Correlation analysis

The name Rhea was primarily given to the pipeline as a phonetic and visual link to the R language used throughout development. Moreover, as stated in the original publication, the name was chosen to reflect the flowing and evolving nature of the scripts, as "flow" is one of the suggested etymology of the name of the mythological goddess Rhea.
