= RIA =

A ria is a landform.

Ria or RIA may refer to:

== People ==
- Ria (given name), a list of people
- Ria (singer), New Zealand 21st century singer

== Film and television ==
- Ria (film), a 2026 drama by Alvin Belarmino

== Business ==
=== Media ===
- Astro Ria, Malaysian pay-TV channel 104
- Ria 89.7FM, a Singaporean radio station
- RIA Novosti, a Russian state domestic news agency
- RIA, formerly Research Institute of America, an American publisher on tax and regulatory matters owned by Thomson Reuters

=== Other business uses ===
- RIA (restaurant), Chicago
- Ria Money Transfer, a remittances operator based in California
- Rock Island Armory, a former American military surplus and firearms seller
- Registered investment advisor, United States

== Military ==
- Royal Irish Artillery, an Irish regiment of the British army
- Royal Italian Army, the army of the Kingdom of Italy
- Rock Island Arsenal, army base on the Mississippi River

== Science ==
- Radioimmunoassay
- Rare Isotope Accelerator
- Research into Ageing

== Technology ==
- RateItAll, a review website
- Rich Internet Application
- Railway Industry Association, a trade association in the United Kingdom
- Robotic Industries Association

== Other uses ==
- Regulatory impact analysis, a document assessing the impact of a new government regulation
- Royal Irish Academy, an academic body
- IATA code of Santa Maria Airport (Rio Grande do Sul), Brazil
- RIA, station code of Rhoose Cardiff International Airport railway station, Wales

== See also ==
- Riya, a feminine given name
- Rea (disambiguation)
- Rhea (disambiguation)
- R1A (disambiguation)
- Rio (disambiguation)
- Ríos (disambiguation)
