= Rheea Mukherjee =

Indian author

Rheea Mukherjee is an Indian writer and author. Her work includes fiction, short stories and nonfiction, with subjects ranging from interpersonal relationships and identity to contemporary social issues.

Mukherjee studied at the California College of the Arts, where she received a Master of Fine Arts degree. She has also worked in creative writing and communications. In 2012, she co-founded the Bangalore Writers Workshop and subsequently worked with the Bengaluru-based content and design studio Write Leela Write.

Her published fiction includes the short-story collection Transit for Beginners (2016) and the novels The Body Myth (2019) and The Girl Who Kept Falling in Love (2023). The Body Myth examines relationships, intimacy and perceptions of illness through the experiences of its central characters. The Girl Who Kept Falling in Love follows a first-generation Indian American woman and explores relationships, identity and social expectations.

In 2026, Mukherjee published Liar, Liar: The True Story of the Social Justice Scammer Who Faked Cancer and Death, a nonfiction book published by Harper Non Fiction India. The book examines an online deception involving a woman who presented herself as a social-justice activist and claimed to have cancer. Mukherjee recounts her own interactions with the woman and the subsequent investigation into the claims, using the episode to examine questions surrounding online identities, trust, social-media communities and charitable or activist networks.

Mukherjee's writing has appeared in publications including Scroll.in, HuffPost, Chicago Review of Books, Electric Literature, Southern Humanities Review, Cleaver Magazine, Out of Print and Bengal Lights. Her fiction and other writing have also received literary recognition, including a Pushcart Prize nomination.

== Books ==
- Transit for Beginners (2016) — Short-story collection
- The Body Myth (2019) — Novel
- The Girl Who Kept Falling in Love (2023) — Novel
- Liar, Liar: The True Story of the Social Justice Scammer Who Faked Cancer and Death (2026) — Non-fiction / true-crime book
