= Peter Fraenkel (civil engineer) =

Peter Fraenkel (5 July 1915 – 18 November 2009) was a civil engineer who was instrumental in the revitalisation of the British canal network through the Fraenkel Report of 1970 and the winner of the Telford Medal for his work on Port Talbot harbour in south Wales.

== Early years ==
Fraenkel was born in Breslau, Germany (now Wroclaw in Poland). His parents were German and he was brought up as a Lutheran even though his father was Jewish. They sent Peter to London at the age of 16 and he studied civil engineering at Imperial College. When WWII began, he was assigned to the Ministry of Works to supervise the building of brigade camps that would be used for soldier training.

== Early career ==
After WWII, he joined Rendel Palmer and Tritton and specialized in heavy marine engineering projects. He worked on the creation of the Port Talbot harbor in South Wales and was awarded the Telford medal after presenting this project at the Institution of Civil Engineers.

In 1975, Fraenkel put together the Fraenkel report about the UK's 3100 km of canals and whether they could be brought back for commercial use. He argued that there was a case for restoring much of these canals with the government's funding. After this report was submitted to the Department of the Environment, many projects were accomplished such as the restoration of 39 locks on the Kennet and Avon canal and the restoration of the Avoncliff aqueduct.

== Consultancy ==
Fraenkel set up his own consultancy in 1972. He won projects all over the world and received the Queen's award for enterprise in 1982.

== Death ==
Fraenkel died at the age of 94 on 18 November 2009. He is survived by his wife, Barbara, of 62 years and his two daughters, Laura and Sarah.
