= Kylerhea =

Village on the east coast of the Isle of Skye, in Scotland

Coordinates: 57.22°N 5.67°W

Kylerhea: Scottish Gaelic: Caol Reatha
- Location within the Isle of Skye
- Council area: Highland
- Lieutenancy area: Ross and Cromarty
- Country: Scotland
- Sovereign state: United Kingdom
- Post town: ISLE OF SKYE
- Postcode district: IV40
- Dialling code: 01599
- Police: Scotland
- Fire: Scottish
- Ambulance: Scottish
- UK Parliament: Inverness, Skye and West Ross-shire
- Scottish Parliament: Ross, Skye and Inverness West

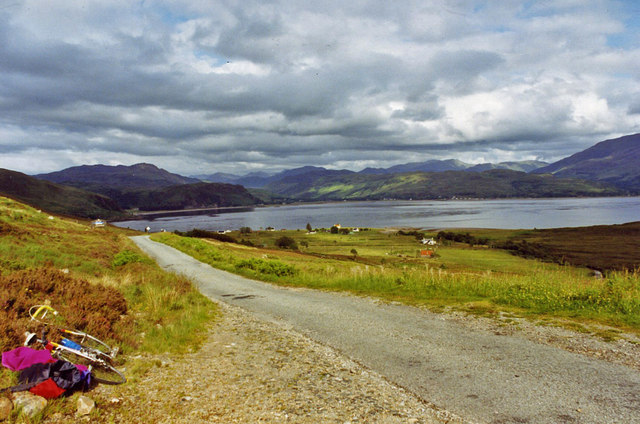
Kylerhea

Kylerhea (Scottish Gaelic: Caol Reatha) is a village on the east coast of the Isle of Skye, in the Scottish Highlands, overlooking Kyle Rhea, a strait splitting Skye from the Scottish mainland. The village is named after Rhea, a Celtic mythological hero. A ferry service has linked Kylerhea with Glenelg on the mainland for centuries. The first car ferry was introduced in 1935, with a turntable located on the boat. Despite the existence of the now toll-free Skye Bridge, this ferry service, undertaken by the MV Glenachulish, still runs during the summer months, due to its popularity as the more scenic and traditional route between Skye and the mainland. This service is now community-owned but used to be run by Murdo Mackenzie for almost twenty years.

For centuries, Kylerhea was the crossing point for cattle reared across the Hebrides on its way to the markets of the mainland. Drovers would reach the village and wait for suitable tidal flows across Kyle Rhea, often recharging with a meal or sleep in The Old Inn, situated close to the crossing point.

Kylerhea is well known for its otter sanctuary. Cars can be parked on top of the hill and then a gentle stroll taken through the pine woods to the viewing hide, located in a good position overlooking the Kyle, the beach and the large white lighthouse. The otters are difficult to spot as they are more secretive than the grey and common seals that can easily be seen basking on the shore. Birds seen around the bay are cormorants, herring gulls and great black-backed gulls. In the forest and moorland higher up on the hill smaller birds are very common. European stonechats, willow warblers and wood warblers sing from perches just off the path but the robins and chaffinches are far bolder and will hop around the path just two feet away from human visitors.

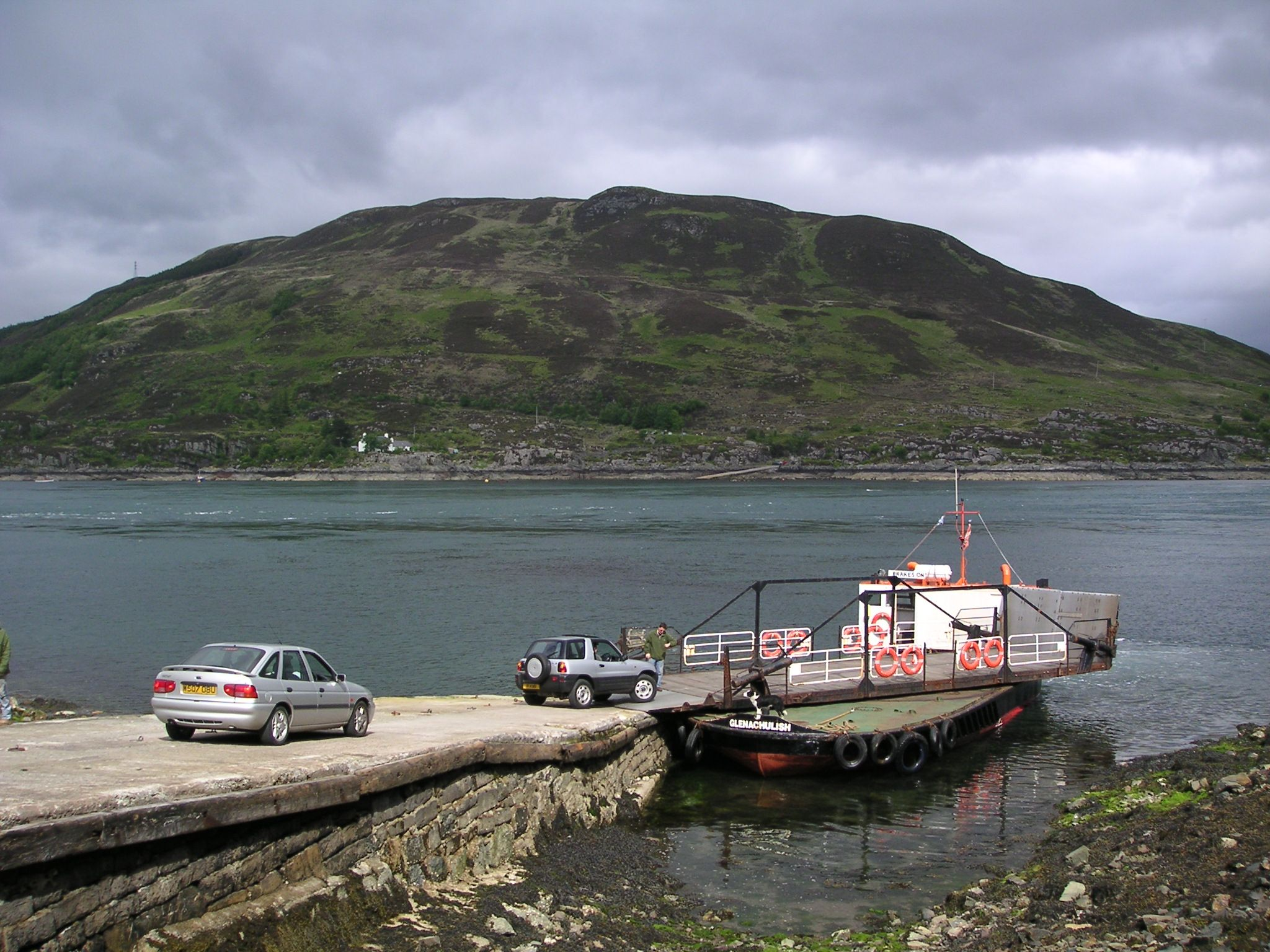
Glenelg-Kylerhea ferry
