= Ampeak Energy =

Renewable energy company

Ampeak Energy Limited
- Company type: Public Limited Company
- Traded as: LSE: AMP
- ISIN: SG9999011118
- Industry: Renewable energy
- Predecessor: SAE Renewables Limited
- Headquarters: Singapore (Registered office); Edinburgh, Scotland, United Kingdom (Head office)
- Key people: Duncan Black (Chairman); Graham Reid (Chief Executive)
- Subsidiaries: MeyGen Holdings Limited; Islay Tidal Power Limited; Islay Holdings Limited; Tidal Power Scotland Limited; Atlantis Projects Pte Ltd; Simec Uskmouth Power Limited
- Website: ampeak.energy

Ampeak Energy Limited (formerly: SAE Renewables, SIMEC Atlantis Energy and previously Atlantis Resources) is a renewable energy company. It is incorporated in Singapore, but its operational headquarters are in Edinburgh, Scotland, United Kingdom.

Initially, it was a developer of the tidal power turbines and projects, but after becoming a part of GFG Alliance it has expanded its business to also include waste-to-energy, hydropower, and battery energy storage. The tidal turbine development was split out to Proteus Marine Renewables in 2022.

== History ==
The company was originally founded as Atlantis Energy Limited in Brisbane, Australia. In 2005, the company established a base in Singapore, where the company remains registered, however the head office was moved to Edinburgh in 2014.

The company acquired the MeyGen project in November 2013, described as Europe's largest tidal power project, located in the Pentland Firth, north of the Scottish mainland.

In February 2014, Atlantis became the world's first tidal energy company to float on the London Stock Exchange's AIM sub-market and commenced construction on MeyGen. On 20 February 2017, the company announced that it had completed the phase 1a of the Meygen project. This phase included the design, manufacture and deployment of four 1.5 MW turbines. The project received £1.5 million Scottish Government grant in 2020.

A number of strategic investments and acquisitions occurred in late 2015 and throughout 2016. Atlantis acquired the tidal turbine developer Marine Current Turbines from Siemens, including the SeaGen turbine in Strangford Lough, and a portfolio of six project sites. SAE also acquired two other projects from ScottishPower Renewables, the 100 MW Ness of Duncansby site in the Pentland Firth to the east of the MeyGen project, and a 10 MW project in the Sound of Islay. In 2016 the company decided to focus on the most developed sites, so returned the agreement for lease for two potential projects to the Crown Estate, one at Kylerhea between Skye and the Scottish mainland and one at Anglesey Skeries, North Wales.

In 2017, GFG Alliance acquired 49.99% stake in the company in return of the coal-fired Uskmouth power station, which was to be converted to a 220 MW waste-to-energy plant. Consequently, Atlantis Resources was renamed SIMEC Atlantis Energy (SAE). In early 2021 the planning was called-in by the Welsh Government for the development of Uskmouth power station, putting the project in doubt. The project was abandoned in April 2022.

In 2019, SAE acquired the Scottish hydro developer Green Highland Renewables.

In 2020, it created a subsidiary Atlantis Operations Japan, which will build a tidal turbine between the southern Japanese islands of Hisaka and Naru islands for Kyuden Mirai Energy. The 500 kW AR500 turbine was built at the Nigg Energy Park, and shipped to Japan for installation. The turbine was reported to have produced 10 MWh of energy in the first days of operation in early February 2021. The turbine was decommissioned in December 2023, and will be upgraded in Japan for redeployment in 2025.

Also in 2020, SAE announced plans to develop a 160 MW Wyre tidal barrage on the River Wyre. This would be in conjunction with Natural Energy Wyre Limited, who started developing the project in 2015. It is proposed the barrage would span the river between Fleetwood and Knott End, and would generate 90 MW of electricity.

In October 2022, there was a management buyout of the Advanced Tidal Engineering and Services (ATES) division, along with the associated IP and staff, forming a new company called Proteus Marine Renewables. SAE remains a minority shareholder in the new company, with a 21% stake. Proteus Marine will continue to supply turbines to SAE, for MeyGen and other projects.

SAE developed proposals for a 300 MW battery energy storage system in the north of Scotland, to be located approximately 2 miles (3 km) from the Castle of Mey, which was bought and restored by the late Queen Elizabeth The Queen Mother. The scheme was opposed by councillors from Highland, citing impact on the Castle of Mey and local tourism including the North Coast 500 route.

On 21 August 2025, the company name was changed from SIMEC Atlantis Energy Limited to Ampeak Energy Limited.

In partnership with EDF Energy, Ampeak Energy is developing the AW1 Battery Energy Storage System at Uskmouth power station. Originally rated at 120 MW/240 MWh, it is being expanded to 480 MWh capacity in 2025.

== Operations ==
Ampeak has commercial and project development teams based in Edinburgh. Through its subsidiaries, the company is developing the 6 MW Meygen tidal turbine array in Pentland Firth, Scotland.

In the cooperation with the China Shipbuilding Industry Corporation and the China Three Gorges Corporation, it helped to design the 500-kilowatt tidal-stream turbine which was installed between Putuoshan and Huludao islands in the Zhoushan archipelago, China.

It had an operations base located at Nigg Energy Park in Invergordon and the turbine and engineering services division was located in Bristol. In Japan, it supplied the 500-kilowatt tidal-stream turbine which was between Hisaka and Naru. In France, SIMEC Atlantis Energy held a 49% stake in Normandie Hydroliennes, the marine energy development company which is developing 12 MW tidal power project in Raz Blanchard. All of these were transferred to Proteus Marine in October 2022.

== Tidal turbine development ==
Atlantis developed and tested various different turbines, initially as Atlantis Energy, then Atlantis Resources, and later as SIMEC Atlantis. In 2022, Proteus Marine Renewables was formed from a management buyout of the Advanced Tidal Engineering and Services division of SIMEC Atlantis, and continues the turbine development.

=== Atlantis Energy ===
In 2002, Atlantis Energy tested a 100 kW tidal power device called the "Aquanator" in the straight between San Remo, Victoria and Phillip Island. It was connected to the grid in September 2006. Previously, a 5 kW version had been tested in the Clarence River.

=== Atlantis Resources ===
Atlantis Resources tested two "Nereus" turbines at San Remo, the 150 kW AN-150 and the 400 kW AN-400. In May 2008, the Aquanator was replaced by the AN-150. In July 2008, the AN-400 (or Nereus II) turbine was tow-tested in an open ocean environment, reportedly with record power output and improved water-to-wire efficiency. The San Remo site was then decommissioned in 2015.

The Aquanator and Nereus devices consisted of a large number of straight Aquafoil blades mounted on a chain between two gearwheels, somewhat like a continuous track, but with the blades in the same plane as the wheels. They were designed for shallow water, around 25 metres (82 ft), and low current conditions. The Nereus turbine was 12 by 4 m (39 by 13 ft).

Atlantis also developed the "Solon" AS series, which was a ducted horizontal-axis axial turbine. In 2008, a 160 kW version was tested in Corio Bay. In August 2008, the 500 kW AS-500 was tow-tested in Singaporean waters. In August 2009, the 1 MW "Solon-K" was announced, with the aim to deploy it the following year. In August 2010, the AK-1000 was unveiled at the companies facilities in Invergordon, described at the time as the largest tidal turbine of its type, rated at 1 MW. Unconventionally, this turbine had two rotors mounted either end of a common shaft, designed to harness the ebb and flood tides. Each rotor was 18 m (59 ft) diameter with three blades. The turbine was mounted on a gravity base foundation that weighed 1,300 tonnes and was 22.5 m (74 ft) high. By October 2010, the turbine had been installed at the European Marine Energy Centre in Orkney, but developed a blade fault before it could be tested. Singapore based Tempco Manufacturing took responsibility for the fault.

The following year, the 1 MW AR1000 was tested at EMEC. It was connected to the electricity grid in May 2011, and produced first power in July. The turbine had a single three-bladed rotor, 18 m (59 ft) in diameter, and reached its rated power of 1 MW in a current of 2.65 m/s (5.15 kn; 5.9 mph). It was expected to undergo two years of testing, however an issue with a non-redundant medium-voltage component prevented further generation to the grid. The turbine was removed in late November 2011 and transported to the New and Renewable Energy Centre (Narec) in Blyth. There, it underwent testing on the 3 MW drive train testing facility, for accelerated life testing.

In 2013, Atlantis Resources entered into a partnership with Lockheed Martin to develop and manufacture their next-generation turbine, the 1.5 MW AR1500 for use at the MeyGen project.

=== SIMEC Atlantis ===
In January 2021, SIMEC Atlantis deployed a 0.5 MW AR500 tidal turbine in the Naru Strait in the Gotō island chain in southern Japan. The planned six-month test was extended to 11 months, with the turbine eventually being decommissioned in November. The turbine was designed and manufactured at the Nigg Energy Park in Scotland, before being disassembled and shipped to Japan prior to installation.

Also in 2021, SIMEC Atlantis announced they were ready to start construction of a 2 MW AR2000 turbine. This would include a novel variable pitch system developed in a European Union funded project. Two of these turbines were expected to be installed at the MeyGen project, but this did not happen.

== See also ==
- MeyGen
