= MV Glenachulish =

Scottish turntable ferry

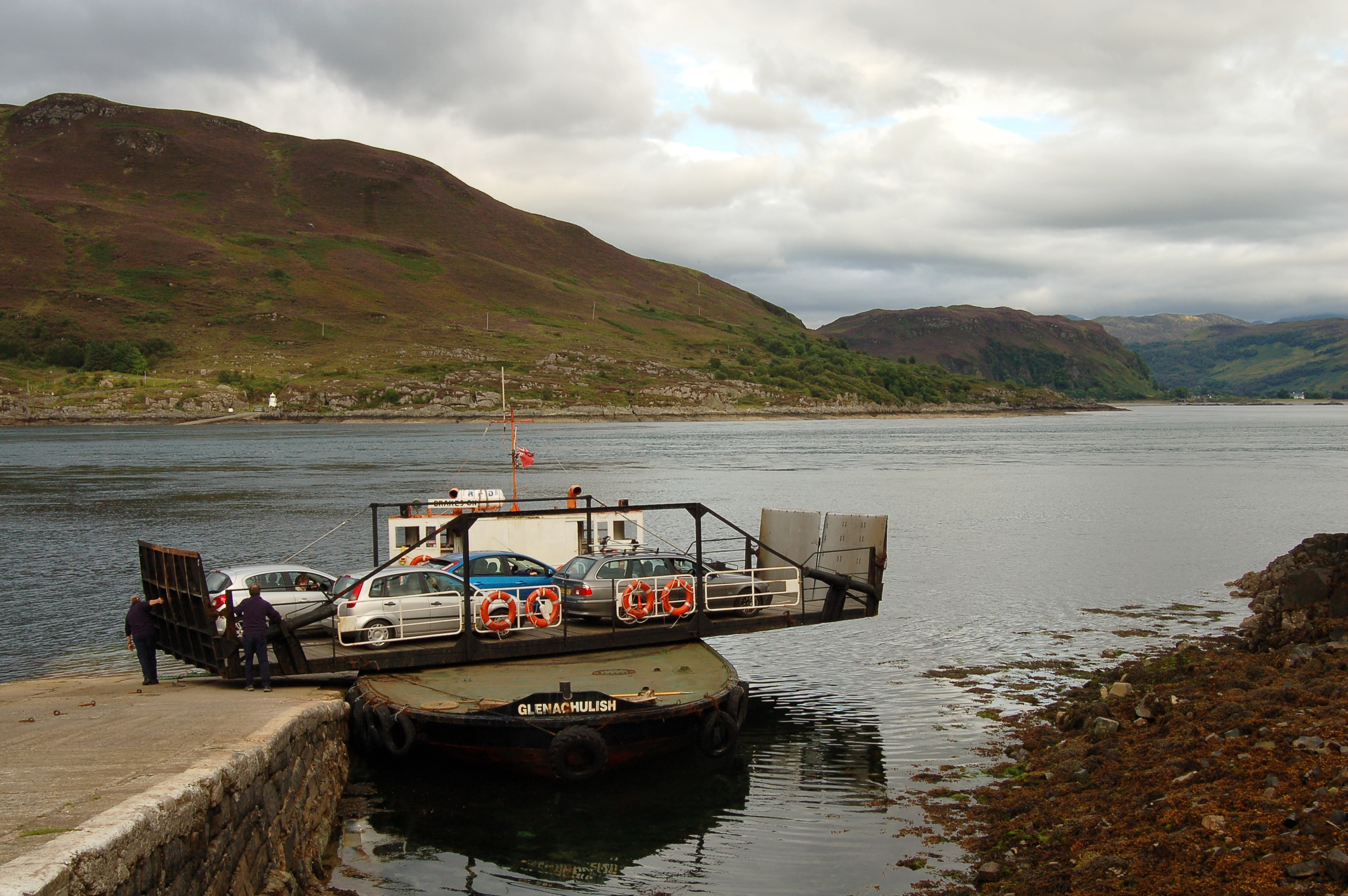
- MV Glenachulish at Kylerhea

History
- Name: MV Glenachulish
- Owner: Isle of Skye Ferry Community Interest Company
- Builder: Ailsa Shipbuilding Company, Troon
- Yard number: 529
- Status: in service

General characteristics
- Length: 57 ft 7 in (17.55 m)
- Beam: 21 ft 7 in (6.58 m)
- Capacity: 6 cars

MV Glenachulish is a ferry operating a summer service between Glenelg, on the Scottish mainland, and Kylerhea, on the Isle of Skye. Built in 1969, she is the last manually operated steel turntable ferry in the world. The route avoids the 36-mile (58 km) road journey via the Skye Bridge.

== History ==
Glenachulish was built at the now-defunct Ailsa Shipbuilding Company in Troon in 1969. She is named after Glenachulish, a glen and hamlet near South Ballachulish.

In 2006, Murdo Mackenzie, the owner of the ferry, was planning to retire. A community interest company was formed by local residents to buy the ferry and run the service.

In 2008, the ferry was featured in the film Made of Honour.

In January 2012, following a landslide blocking the A890 road, Glenachulish began a service at Stromeferry. The service crossed Loch Carron to North Strome, avoiding a 140-mile (230-kilometre) diversion by road.

== Service ==
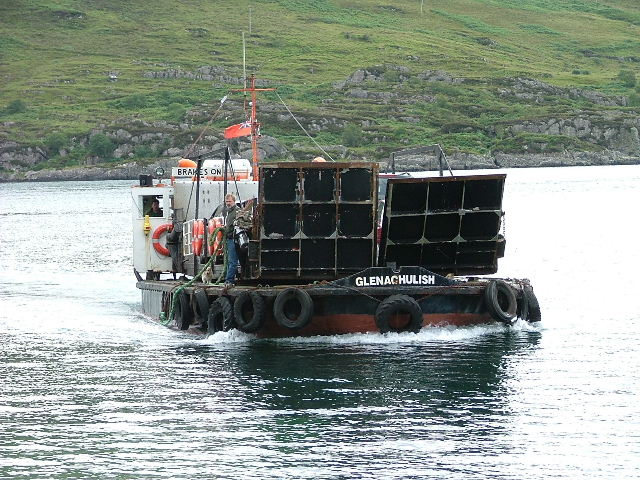
Glenachulish approaching Kylerhea

From 1969 to 1975, Glenachulish operated at Ballachulish. After the opening of the Ballachulish Bridge, she became the relief ferry at Corran, Kessock, and Kylesku. The latter two routes have since been replaced with bridges.

There has been a ferry on this route for over 400 years, with a car ferry since 1934. It is one of only two remaining ferries to Skye from the mainland – the other is the Caledonian MacBrayne service between Mallaig and Armadale.

Since 1982, Glenachulish has operated the Glenelg ferry across Kylerhea narrows. The 550-metre (600-yard) crossing takes five minutes and is the shortest sea crossing to Skye. The ferry runs seven days a week between Easter and October. It operates every twenty minutes (or as required, if it is busy) from 10am to 6pm (to 7pm June to August).
