= Peter Fraenkel (marine engineer) =

Scottish marine engineer

Peter Fraenkel, MBE, is a marine engineer, visiting professor at the University of Edinburgh School of Engineering and a fellow of the Institution of Mechanical Engineers and of the Energy Institute. He is the inventor of the tidal power plant SeaGen.

In 2013, Fraenkel won the Scottish Government's Saltire Prize medal.

He is also the founder of the company Gravitricity, to exploit his concept of suspending heavy weights in abandoned mine shafts to store energy.

== See also ==
- Gravity battery
