= Acunn and Riadh =

Celtic mythological heroes

The brothers Acunn and Riadh (or Rhea, Readh) are Celtic mythological heroes and fénnids featured in the Scottish Fenian narratives.

In one version of the legend, Acunn and Riadh were great friends, living in two towers in Glenelg. However, on one cold day, Riadh stole a burning peat from his brother's tower to light his own fire for warmth. Upon Acunn's discovery of Riadh's theft, a fight ensued, thus scattering stones all over the bay of Glenelg, as described by Mary Ethel Muir Donaldson.

The brothers were said to have been buried at Baghan, a local harbour in Torrin, Scotland. Acunn is the possible etymological origin of Kyleakin, a village in Scotland, whereas Kylerhea might be named after Riadh.
