= Alderney Race =

Strait between Alderney and Cap de la Hague

Coordinates: 49.72°N 2.07°W

The Alderney Race is a strait that runs between Alderney and Cap de la Hague, a cape at the northwestern tip of the Cotentin Peninsula in Normandy. A strong current runs through the race north of the Passage de la Déroute, a treacherous passage separating the Cotentin from the Channel Islands. The current is intermittent, varying with the tide, and can run up to about 12 knots (22 km/h; 14 mph) during equinoctial tides. The French call it Raz Blanchard. In Norman French it is called L'Raz.

== Location ==
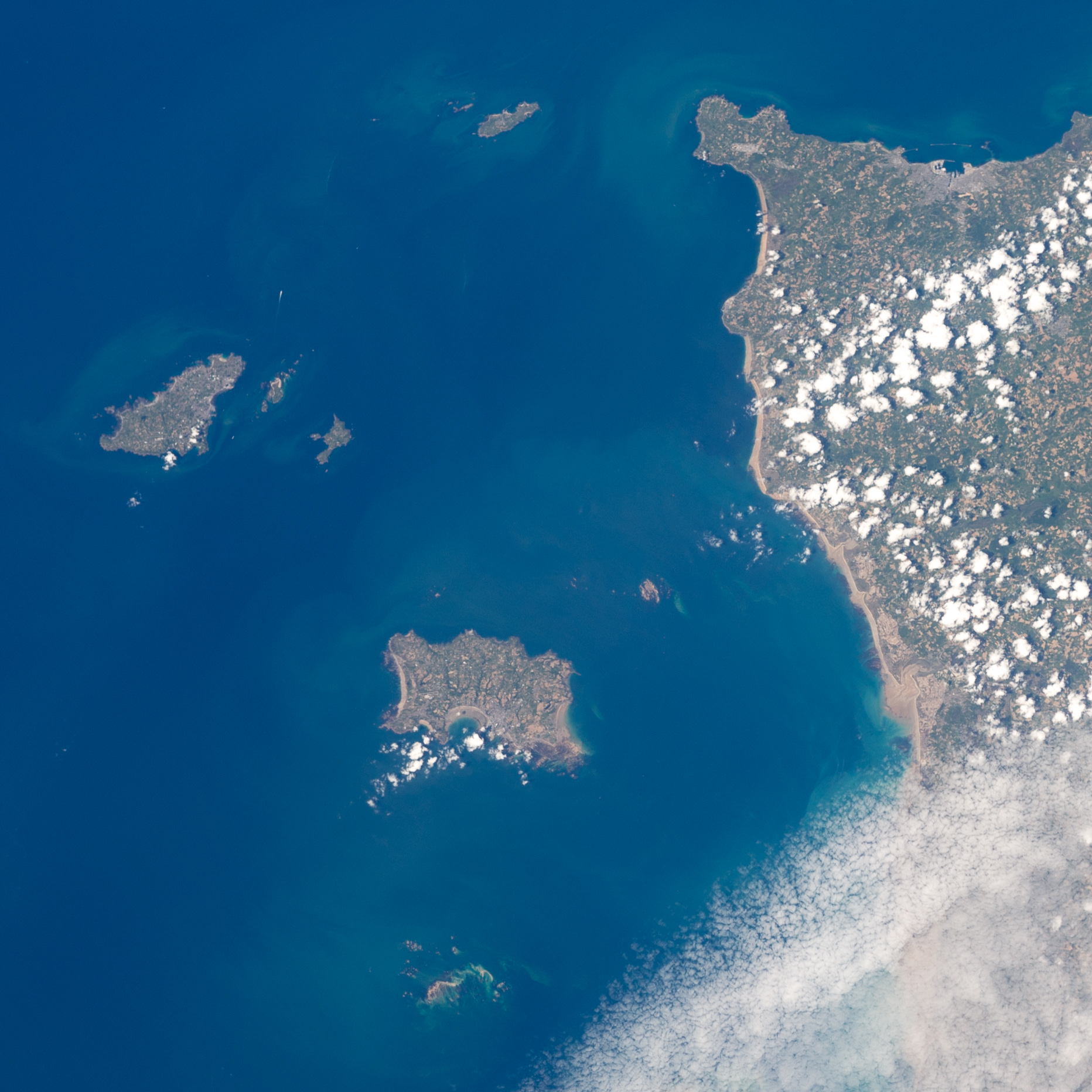
Passage de la Déroute.

The Alderney Race is 8 nautical miles (15 km; 9.2 mi) across and located roughly between Alderney, in the Bailiwick of Guernsey, and La Hague, France. It constitutes the northeastern limit of the Gulf of Saint-Malo.

== Sea conditions ==
When the wind and the race current flow in opposite directions, the sea becomes particularly chaotic: wave heights can reach 4 metres (13 ft) and have wavelengths smaller than 50 metres (164 ft). The waves break with violence, thus making shipping conditions particularly dangerous. On the contrary, when the wind and the stream flow in the same direction, the sea becomes calm, provided that the tidal coefficient is not too great.

The uneven seabed – both Alderney and La Hague lie in the Armorican Massif – makes the situation more complicated. Bad weather can produce abundant wind-blown foam, making visibility poor. During good weather, opposing wind and currents can cause breaking waves, especially at Banc de la Schôle and at Longis Bay in Alderney.

== Hydrology ==
The power of the current comes from the narrowness of the strait and from the fact that there is a 2-metre (6 ft 7 in) tidal height difference between Carteret and La Hague as well as between la Hague and Cherbourg.

== Tidal power ==
Because of the enormous potential it sees in tidal power, the French government plans to use tidal turbines to tap the energy of the Race.

Alderney and the Alderney Race seen from Auderville in France.

== See also ==
- La Hague – Administrative division in Normandy, France
- English Channel – Body of water between Great Britain and France
