= MeyGen =

Tidal energy facility in Scotland

- Country: Scotland
- Coordinates: 58°39′30″N 3°7′30″W
- Status: Operational
- Construction began: 2014
- Commission date: 2016
- Owner: Ampeak Energy

Tidal power station
- Type: Tidal stream generator
- Type of TSG: Horizontal axis

Power generation
- Units operational: 4
- Nameplate capacity: 6 MW (4 × 1.5 MW)
- Annual net output: 10.2 GWh (2023)

MeyGen (full name MeyGen tidal energy project) is a tidal stream energy plant in the north of Scotland. The project is located in the Pentland Firth, specifically the Inner Sound between the Island of Stroma and the Scottish mainland.

It is being constructed in a phased manner. The first phase of the project uses four 1.5 MW turbines with 18-metre-diameter (59 ft) rotors which were installed submerged on the seabed in winter 2016/17. Meygen has been claimed to be the "world's largest tidal stream power project". A total of 59 MW of further capacity was awarded in the Contracts for Difference Allocations Rounds 4, 5 and 6 covering 2021-2024. There are plans for up to 400 MW to be installed at the site.

The project is owned and run by Ampeak Energy (formerly called SAE Renewables, SIMEC Atlantis Energy, and prior to 2017 Atlantis Resources). It was previously owned and run by Tidal Power Scotland Limited and Scottish Enterprise.

The high speed of currents in the area, reaching up to 5 m/s (11 mph), made the chosen site in the Pentland Firth well suited to this type of energy generation.

== History ==
In October 2010, the newly named "MeyGen" tidal project from the nearby Castle of Mey and "Gen" for generation was created by a consortium of Atlantis Resources Limited and Morgan Stanley and received an operational lease from the Crown Estate to accommodate a 400 MW project for 25 years. In 2011 Norwegian partners Statkraft pulled out of the project.

A consent was granted in 2013, under Section 36 of the Electricity Act, to construct up to 61 two- or three-bladed turbines with a total installed capacity of 86 MW. This was subject to construction in a phased manner so that potential environmental impacts could be understood. Each turbine was limited to 16–20 m in rotor diameter, rated at 1.0–2.4 MW, and connected to the grid by 6.6 kV cables.

Marine Scotland granted the project a license in January 2014. This initially only lasted until the end of 2020, but was extended in July 2016 to cover the period until 1 January 2041 or 25 years after completion of phase 1a.

Construction work on the project started in January 2015, building an access road towards the sea where the onshore power conversion building would be located.

In November 2016, the first turbine (TTG1) was installed, and in December it was announced that it had begun full power operations. TTG1, 2 and 3 were supplied by Andritz Hydro Hammerfest, and were joined by one further AR1500 turbine developed by Atlantis Resources with design support from Lockheed Martin. All four turbines were installed by February 2017, with the marine works undertaken by James Fisher Marine Services (previously Mojo Maritime). Phase 1 (formerly called Phase 1a) began operations in April 2018. Phase 1 is still in operation, with one Andritz Hydro Hammerfest machine having been continuously subsea and in operation since 2018.

Some elements of the project were constructed outside the licensed area; however, after statutory consultation, Marine Scotland varied the license in September 2017 to extend the consented site area. It was considered there were no additional impacts and that asking for full removal may have had adverse impacts.

Phase 1b was initially planned to add a further 4 MW comprising two AR2000 turbines, with another 73.5 MW in Phase 1c. Phase 1b was then revised to installing four turbines, bringing the total to eight. This required the Section 36 consent to be varied, to allow the additional two turbines above the six permitted in Phase 1. However, this phase did not proceed.

In July 2022, MeyGen plc was awarded a contract to supply 28 MW of electricity to the GB grid in the Contracts for difference (CfD) Allocation Round 4 (AR4), which will be used to support the construction of Phase 2 which as of 2024 was due to be commissioned in 2027.

Four further contracts totalling 21.94 MW were awarded in the CfD AR5 auction in September 2023. An application was then submitted to vary the license conditions, to permit a smaller number of larger turbines to be used. These would be up to 24 m in diameter. The application would also remove the limit on the rated power per turbine, and increase the maximum voltage of the underwater cables to 33 kV.

As of January 2024, the plan is to install the next 28 MW of turbines as Phase 2 to be commissioned by 2027, and a further 22 MW as Phase 3 by 2028. Phase 2 is planned to consist of a further 10 turbines.

In September 2024, the MeyGen project was awarded a further 9 MW in the CfD AR6 auction, to be delivered in 2028/29.

The site has the potential for a further 312 MW to be deployed beyond that, subject to expanding the consent. This would amount to 398 MW in total.

By 2018 the four turbines had produced 8 GWh. In 2019, they produced 13.8 GWh. Total cumulative production was 51 GWh by March 2023. As of August 2025 this was 80 GWh.

The project received £1.5 million Scottish Government grant from the Saltire Tidal Energy Challenge Fund in 2020, to develop a sub-sea hub to connect multiple turbines.

In July 2025, one of the turbines clocked up 6 1/2 years of operation without unplanned or disruptive maintenance, demonstrating that it is possible to operate tidal turbines in the harsh subsea conditions for long periods. The MeyGen operations and maintenance manager expects it will remain operational for a further year before being removed from the sea for repairs. The seals and bearings of the turbine were supplied by SKF.

== Project description ==
Phase 1 of the project comprises four 1.5 MW turbines, three Andritz Hydro Hammerfest AH1000 MK1 and one Atlantis Resources AR1500 developed in conjunction with Lockheed Martin. These are all three-bladed horizontal-axis turbines with an 18 m rotor diameter, that reach the 1.5 MW rated power at a current speed of 3 m/s. They are mounted on three-legged gravity foundations that sit on the seabed, each weighing around 350 tonnes with six 200-tonne ballast blocks.

The turbines in phase 1 are connected to the onshore power conversion centre at Ness of Quoys by an individual cable per turbine. These are laid on the seabed, with landfall by 550-metre-long horizontal directionally drilled conduits, installed in July 2015. The cables were installed by James Fisher Marine Services by November 2015, with a total length of 11 km. This used the DP vessel Siem Daya 1, and was completed over a 2½-day neap tide window. The onshore power conversion equipment was supplied by ABB.
