= SeaGen =

Large-scale tidal stream generator (2008–2019)

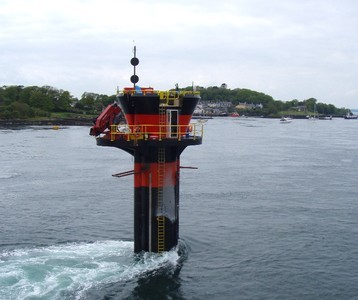
- Commercial tidal stream generator — SeaGen — in Strangford Lough. The visible wake is indicative of the power of the tidal current.
- Location of SeaGen in Northern Ireland
- Country: Northern Ireland, United Kingdom
- Location: Strangford Narrows between Strangford and Portaferry
- Coordinates: 54°22′7.2″N 5°32′45.8″W
- Status: Decommissioned
- Commission date: April 2008
- Decommission date: July 25 2019
- Owner: SIMEC Atlantis Energy Limited

Power generation
- Units decommissioned: 2 x 0.6 MW
- Nameplate capacity: 1.2 MW

External links
- Commons: Related media on Commons

SeaGen was the world's first large scale commercial tidal stream generator. It was four times more powerful than any other tidal stream generator in the world at the time of installation in 2008. It was decommissioned by SIMEC Atlantis Energy Limited in summer 2019, having exported 11.6 GWh to the grid since 2008.

The SeaGen device was installed in Strangford Narrows between Strangford and Portaferry in Northern Ireland. Strangford Lough was also the site of the first known tide mill in the world, the Nendrum Monastery mill where remains dating from 787 CE have been excavated.

== History ==
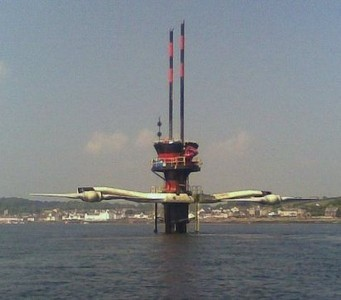
The SeaGen rotors could be raised above the surface for maintenance.

Marine Current Turbines, the developer of SeaGen, demonstrated its first prototype of a tidal stream generator in 1994 with a 15 kilowatt system in Loch Linnhe, off the west coast of Scotland. In May 2003, the prototype for SeaGen, 'SeaFlow', was installed off the coast of Lynmouth, North Devon, England. Seaflow was a single rotor turbine which generated 300 kW but was not connected to the grid. SeaFlow was the world's first offshore tidal generator, and no larger turbines were installed until SeaGen.

The first (and only) SeaGen generator was installed in Strangford Narrows between Strangford and Portaferry in Northern Ireland, in April 2008 and was connected to the grid in July 2008. It generated 1.2 MW for between 18 and 20 hours a day while the tides are forced in and out of Strangford Lough through the Narrows.

During the commissioning of the system, a software error caused the blades of one of the turbines to be damaged. This left the turbine operating at half power until autumn 2008. Full power operation was finally achieved on 18 December 2008.

Marine Current Turbines was sold to Siemens in 2012. Siemens sold the company and technology to rival Atlantis Resources (SIMEC Atlantis Energy) in 2015. The power generation system was shut down, decommissioned, and removed in stages between 2016 and 2019.

== Technology ==
SeaGen generator weighed 300 t (300 long tons). It consisted of twin axial-flow rotors, each driving a generator through a gearbox like a hydro-electric or wind turbine. The gearboxes were three-stage, with two planetary and one spur, giving a 69.8:1 speed increase. The turbines rotated at around 12 rpm, each with a 16 m diameter (200 m² swept area). Adding two rotors doubled the power, for less than twice the cost. MCT were thus considering further multi-rotor systems in future, e.g. six 24 m diameter rotors were claimed to generate over 8 MW.

The SeaGen turbines had a patented feature by which the rotor blades can be pitched through 180 degrees allowing them to operate in both flow directions – on ebb and flood tides. The company claimed a capacity factor of 0.59 (average of the last 2000 hours). The power units of each system were mounted on arm-like extensions either side of a tubular steel monopile some 3 metres (9.8 ft) in diameter and the arms with the power units could be raised above the surface for safe and easy maintenance access. The SeaGen was built at Belfast's Harland and Wolff's shipyards.

== Environmental impact ==
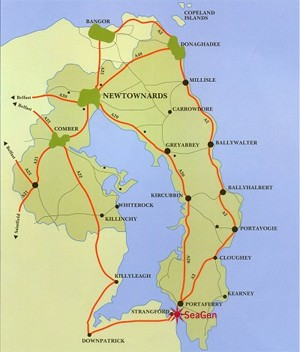
1,800,000 m^{3} (400 million imp gal) of water flow in and out of Strangford Lough twice a day.

SeaGen had been licensed to operate over a period of 5 years, during which it was accompanied by an environmental monitoring programme to determine the precise impact on the marine environment. No major impacts on marine mammals were detected in three-years of operational monitoring. Seals appeared to avoid the device, or transit passed at slack water when the turbine was not generating (i.e. not turning). While there was some small-scale displacement of marine birds, overall numbers in the Strangford Narrows did not change.
