= List of renewable energy organizations =

This is a list of notable renewable energy organizations:

== Associations ==
=== Bioenergy ===
- World Bioenergy Association
- Biomass Thermal Energy Council (BTEC)
- Pellet Fuels Institute

=== Geothermal energy ===
- Geothermal Energy Association
- Geothermal Rising

=== Hydropower ===
- International Hydropower Association (IHA) (International)
- National Hydropower Association (US)

=== Renewable energy ===
- Agency for Non-conventional Energy and Rural Technology (ANERT), Kerala, India
- American Council on Renewable Energy
- American Solar Energy Society
- EKOenergy
- Energy-Quest
- Environmental and Energy Study Institute
- EurObserv'ER
- European Renewable Energy Council
- Green Power Forum
- International Renewable Energy Agency (IRENA)
- International Renewable Energy Alliance (REN Alliance)
- Office of Energy Efficiency and Renewable Energy
- REN21
- Renewable and Appropriate Energy Laboratory
- Renewable Energy and Energy Efficiency Partnership (REEEP)
- RenewableUK
- Renewable Fuels Association
- Rocky Mountain Institute
- SustainableEnergy
- Trans-Mediterranean Renewable Energy Cooperation
- World Council for Renewable Energy

=== Solar energy ===
- International Solar Alliance(ISA)
- International Solar Energy Society
- Solar Cookers International
- Solar Energy Industries Association (SEIA)
- Wadebridge Renewable Energy Network (WREN)

=== Wind energy ===
- American Wind Energy Association
- Citizen Partnerships for Offshore Wind (CPOW)
- Global Wind Energy Council
- WindEurope
- World Wind Energy Association

== Educational and research institutions ==
=== Renewable energy ===
- Centre for Renewable Energy Systems Technology (CREST) at Loughborough University
- NaREC (UK National Renewable Energy Centre)
- National Renewable Energy Laboratory (NREL)
- RES - The School for Renewable Energy Science (University in Iceland and University in Akureyri)
- Norwegian Centre for Renewable Energy (SFFE) at NTNU, SINTEF.
- Centre for Alternative Technology (CAT)

=== Solar energy ===
- Clean Energy Institute (CEI) at the University of Washington
- Florida Solar Energy Center (FSEC)
- Plataforma Solar de Almería (PSA)

== See also ==
- List of countries by renewable electricity production
- List of renewable energy topics by country
- List of photovoltaics companies
- List of large wind farms
- List of environmental organizations
- List of anti-nuclear groups
- List of photovoltaics research institutes
