= International Hydropower Association =

Hydropower organization

- Formation: 1995
- Type: Non-Profit International Mutual Association of Members
- Headquarters: London
- Location: United Kingdom
- President: Malcolm Turnbull
- Key people: Eddie Rich, Chief Executive Officer
- Website: www.hydropower.org

The International Hydropower Association (IHA) is an international lobby group and membership association representing the global hydropower sector.

IHA has members in more than 120 countries, including over 100 corporate and affiliate members working across sectors such as electricity generation, water management, construction, engineering and related industries. IHA also partners with international organizations, research institutions, governments and civil society. The association's mission is "to advance sustainable hydropower by building and sharing knowledge on its role in renewable energy systems, freshwater management and climate change solutions."

== History ==
The International Hydropower Association (IHA) was formed under the auspices of UNESCO in 1995 as a forum to promote and disseminate good practices and further knowledge about hydropower. IHA employed its first full-time member of staff in 2001. It now consists of five departments, a central office (London), a regional office (South America) and a national office (China).

Following the publication of the World Commission on Dams final report in 2000, IHA participated in the United Nations Environmental Programme’s Dams and Development Project.

In 2004, IHA became a founding member of the International Renewable Energy Alliance (REN Alliance) along with partner organisations representing the bioenergy, geothermal, solar and wind industries. The REN Alliance was established to advance the role of renewable energy systems.

IHA published its first sustainability guidelines for hydropower projects in 2004, followed by the IHA Sustainability Protocol in 2006. This work formed the basis for the Hydropower Sustainability Assessment Forum, a multi-stakeholder body consisting of representatives from government, commercial and development banks, social and environmental NGOs, and the hydropower sector.

Initiated in partnership with the World Wildlife Fund (WWF) and The Nature Conservancy (TNC), the forum was convened over three years to develop a new tool to measure and guide sustainability performance in the hydropower sector: the Hydropower Sustainability Assessment Protocol.

IHA has managed the roll-out and implementation of the protocol since its launch in 2011, and works in partnership with 15 leading companies around the world to promote a better understanding of how this tool can be used in different local and regional contexts.

In 2007, IHA hosted its first world congress in Turkey.

The World Hydropower Congress is now a biennial event. It has been held in Turkey (2007) Iceland (2009), Brazil (2011), Malaysia (2013), China (2015), Ethiopia (2017), France (2019), Costa Rica (2021), and Indonesia (2023).

== Mission ==
IHA aims to advance sustainable hydropower’s role in meeting the world's water and energy needs. The association has the following strategic objectives:

- Advance policies and strategies that strengthen the sector's performance
- Build a vibrant, inclusive and proactive hydropower community
- Create an open, innovative and trusted platform for knowledge
- Deliver value to all members throughout the world

== World Hydropower Congress ==
IHA organizes the biennial World Hydropower Congress, a conference that brings together representatives from government, industry, finance, and civil society. The first congress was held in Antalya, Turkey in 2007. The event has since been held in Reykjavík, Iceland (2009), Iguassu, Brazil (2011), Kuching, Sarawak, Malaysia (2013), Beijing, China (2015), Addis Ababa, Ethiopia (2017), Paris, France (2019), San Jose, Costa Rica (2021), and Bali, Indonesia (2023). The next congress is scheduled for Sydney, Australia in April 2027.

== Organizational structure ==
IHA is governed by a board that comprises an international group of experts, bringing together experience and different international perspectives of hydropower. IHA Board members are elected by IHA's membership.

The IHA Board is currently led by President Mr Roger Gill, six Vice Presidents (from Australia, Brazil, Canada, China, Germany and Malaysia), a further twelve board members (from Australia, Austria, Brazil, France, Norway, India, Iceland, Russia and South Africa), and the chief executive officer (a non-voting board member position), Eddie Rich.

The Board aims for a balanced geographic distribution of representation in its composition and conducts its affairs, including two-yearly elections, according to a formal written constitution and by-laws.

The Board is supported by a Central Office, the administrative arm of the IHA. There are also a number of committees and groups working on strategic and topical issues formed in accordance with Board resolutions.

== Offices ==
IHA's central office is situated in Greater London, United Kingdom. IHA also has regional offices in China and Brazil.

== International policy and representation ==
IHA acts as a voice for hydropower in international governmental and sector water, energy, and climate change forums and in the media. The organization is drawn on as a source for statistics on hydropower for authoritative world energy and renewable energy publications such as the REN21 Global Status Reports and IIASA Global Energy Assessment (GEA). IHA maintains a database of the world's hydropower stations and companies, built in collaboration with regulators, ministries, electricity associations, utilities, and station owners and operators.

IHA has consultative and/or observer status with all United Nations agencies addressing water, energy and climate change and cooperates and collaborates with international organizations with interests in renewable energy such as IEA, WEC, and the World Bank. It is an active participant in the International Renewable Energy Agency (IRENA), founded in Bonn, Germany, on 26 January 2009.

IHA is a founding member of International Renewable Energy Alliance (REN Alliance), which was formed on 4 June 2004, in Bonn, Germany, by the International Geothermal Association (IGA), the International Solar Energy Society (ISES), and the World Wind Energy Association (WWEA). The World Bioenergy Association (WBA) subsequently joined the REN Alliance in June 2009.

== Hydropower Sustainability Assessment Protocol ==
The Hydropower Sustainability Assessment Protocol, is a comprehensive tool to assess the sustainability of hydropower projects.

It was launched in June 2011 at the International Hydropower Association (IHA) World Congress.

It provides a thorough, evidence-based assessment of between 19 and 23 relevant sustainability topics, depending on the development stage of the project.

The Protocol is the product of a rigorous multi-stakeholder development process between 2008 and 2010, involving representatives from social and environmental NGOs (Oxfam, Nature Conservancy, Transparency International, WWF); governments (China, Germany, Iceland, Norway, Zambia); commercial and development banks (including banks that are signatory to the Equator Principles, and the World Bank); and the hydropower sector, represented by IHA.

The Protocol development process included field trials in 16 countries, across six continents, and stakeholder engagement with 1,933 individuals in 28 countries.

The topics cover the three pillars of sustainability: social, economic, and environmental, and include issues such as downstream flow regimes, indigenous peoples, biodiversity, infrastructure safety, resettlement, water quality, and erosion and sedimentation.

The assessment tools are used as a framework to produce a sustainability profile for a hydropower project. In so doing, multiple stakeholders can become better informed on the sustainability profile of a project, and develop strategies to address any weaknesses.

The Protocol can be used during all stages of hydropower project development: early stage, preparation, implementation and operation. This new approach to promote continuous improvement in hydropower sustainability has been designed so that the sustainability of hydropower projects can be assessed anywhere in the world, covering a broad range of possible case scenarios.

== UNESCO/IHA Greenhouse Gas (GHG) Status of Freshwater Reservoirs Research Project ==
The UNESCO / IHA GHG Status of Freshwater Reservoirs Research Project is hosted by IHA, in collaboration with the International Hydrological Programme (IHP) of UNESCO.

The Project is a global initiative to improve understanding of the impact of reservoirs on natural greenhouse gas (GHG) emissions in a river basin. To date, the Project has involved some 160 researchers, scientists and professionals, from more than 100 institutions. The overall objective of the project is the evaluation of changes in GHG emissions due to the impoundment of freshwater reservoirs. The project deliverables include:

- Development of measurement guidance for the evaluation of any change in the pre-existing greenhouse gas emissions
- Promotion of scientifically rigorous measurements on a representative set of reservoirs (in accordance with the above guidelines) and recording of the results in a https://hal.science/hal-01394245/file/FPCG.pdf database
- Development of predictive modelling tools to assess the GHG status of unmonitored reservoirs and potential new reservoir sites
- Development of mitigation guidance for vulnerable sites.

A key milestone in the project was the publication, in 2010, of the GHG Measurement Guidelines for Freshwater Reservoirs, a comprehensive tool to assess the GHG status of freshwater reservoirs, describing standardized procedures for field measurements and calculation methods to estimate the impact of the creation of a reservoir on a river basin's overall GHG emissions. The application of these Guidelines to a set of representative reservoirs worldwide allows the building of a reliable, standardized results database, in order to develop the basis for predictive modelling capability.

Since then, IHA has been involved through this project in the development of a risk screening tool, the GHG Reservoir Screening Tool, that will allow for rapid and low-cost assessment of likely GHG emissions from reservoirs. This will allow developers and operators to assess whether a reservoir is likely to generate emissions, and therefore require further and more detailed examination and modelling.

A revised version of the tool, G-Res, will allocate emissions to the particular services provided by the reservoir. A prototype of the revised tool was launched at the World Hydropower Congress in Beijing, in May 2015.

The tool is intended to inform decision makers if there is likely to be any significant GHG footprint associated with the purposes for which the reservoir is being developed. The tool will be applicable to both existing and planned reservoirs. If the tool identifies a reservoir that is likely to cause a significant impact, the recommended action will include the possibility of detailed modelling.

The GHG Screening Tool provides an estimate of the likely level of total (gross) GHG emissions from a freshwater reservoir. It has been developed as an empirical model, making use of existing published data on gross GHG emissions from previous assessments of 169 reservoirs around the world. The tool output provides an indication of the need for further assessment of GHG emissions.

== Awards ==
=== Mosonyi Award for Excellence in Hydropower ===
Launched in 2015, the Mosonyi Award for Excellence in Hydropower recognizes individuals within IHA's membership for outstanding contributions to the sector. Individual contributions related to the award may include:

- A long-standing commitment or a recent initiative that has had a major impact;
- A specific hydropower project, the performance of an organization or the hydropower sector in general; or
- An aspect of hydropower sustainability (technical, economic, social or environmental) or a broad-ranging initiative, such as national-level or basin-level strategic planning.

Proposed candidates are reviewed by a panel convened by the IHA Board. The panel nominates selected candidates, with the IHA Board making the final decision on the selection of recipients. Up to three individuals received an award in 2015.

The award is named after Professor Emil Mosonyi, the founding president of IHA. Mosonyi, who died in 2009 aged 98, made major contributions during his long career in hydropower. A special award was presented by the IHA Board to Prof. Dr. Emil Mosonyi, IHA Founder and Honorary President, on 20 October 2004 at the closing ceremony of Hydro 2004 in Porto, Portugal.

Recipients of this award are:

- Luiz Gabriel Azevedo, Jean-Étienne Klimpt and Helen Locher (2015).
- Anton-Louis Oliver, Kuang Shangfu and Eduard Wojczynski (2017).
- Karin Seelos, Refaat Abdel Malek, Yan Zhiyong (2019).

=== IHA Blue Planet Prize ===
In collaboration with UNESCO, IHA previously awarded the IHA Blue Planet Prize every two years. The prize recognizes outstanding performance in sustainable management of hydropower schemes. Previous recipients of the award include:

- Andhikhola Hydel and Rural Electrification scheme, Nepal (2005)
- Arrow Lakes power plant, Canada (2005)
- Sechelt Creek power plant, Canada (2005)
- Salto Caxias Project, Brazil (2003)
- Palmiet Pumped Storage Scheme, South Africa (2003)
- King River Hydropower Development, Tasmania, Australia (2001)

The IHA Blue Planet Prize was not awarded during the development phase of the Hydropower Sustainability Assessment Protocol. It was officially relaunched during the 2015 World Hydropower Congress in Beijing, and was awarded in 2017.

== Criticism ==
In 2013, IHA held their World Hydropower Congress in Sarawak, Malaysia. The choice of location was criticized for appearing to legitimize local government plans to build dams that would displace tens of thousands of people. IHA President Richard Taylor responded by emphasizing that the congress would be "international in nature" and would represent "alternative viewpoints".

== Publications ==
- Hydropower Status Report (annual)
- Hydropower Sustainability Assessment Protocol (November 2010)
- GHG Measurement Guidelines for Freshwater Reservoirs (2010)

== See also ==
- Electricity
- Energy
- Hydroelectricity
- Hydropower
- List of notable renewable energy organizations
- List of public utilities
- REN Alliance
- Sustainable energy
- Water management
- Utilities
