= International Renewable Energy Alliance =

International Renewable Energy Alliance (REN Alliance) is a formal partnership entered into on 4 June 2004 by five non-profit international renewable energy organisations:

- International Hydropower Association (IHA),
- International Solar Energy Society (ISES),
- International Geothermal Association (IGA),
- World Wind Energy Association (WWEA),
- World Bioenergy Association (WBA). (Since June 2009)

They represent the hydro, geothermal, solar, and wind power/energy and bioenergy sector. The alliance provides a unified cross-sectoral voice on renewable energy in international and regional energy fora and media.

Climate change concerns, coupled with high oil prices, peak oil, and increasing government support, are driving increasing renewable energy legislation, incentives and commercialization. As of 2011, 119 countries have some form of national renewable energy policy target or renewable support policy. National targets now exist in at least 98 countries. There is also a wide range of policies at state/provincial and local levels.

As of December 2019, the honorary chairman of the REN Alliance is former Australian senator Peter Rae, who was previously also chairman of Hydro Tasmania.

== See also ==
- Bioenergy
- Geothermal energy
- Hydropower
- Solar energy
- Wind energy
- World Council for Renewable Energy (WCRE)
- International Solar Alliance
- List of countries by renewable electricity production
- List of notable renewable energy organizations
- List of renewable energy topics by country and territory
