= World Wind Energy Association =

- Company type: NGO
- Founded: 2001 in Denmark
- Headquarters: Bonn, Germany
- Key people: Hon. Peter Rae (President); Stefan Gsänger (Secretary General); Prof. Dr Jami Hossain (Vice President & Technical Chair); Henrich Bartelt (Vice President); Ibrahim Togola (Vice President); Prof. Chuichi Arakawa (Vice President); Stefan Gsänger (Secretary General); Dr. Choong Yul Son (Hon Vice President); Dr. Tanay Uyar Sidki (Vice President); Dr. Galal Osman (Vice President); Dr. Andriy Konechenkov (Vice President)

The World Wind Energy Association (WWEA) is an international non-profit association representing the wind power sector worldwide, with members in 100 countries, amongst them the leading national and regional wind energy associations. The organisation works for the promotion and worldwide deployment of wind energy technology and advocates a future energy system based on renewable energy.

== History ==
The World Wind Energy Association WWEA was founded in 2001 as an international organization for the worldwide promotion of wind energy and has a broad societal representation and interest in wind energy utilization across the world. The founding members of WWEA are the national wind energy associations in many countries. The other members include consulting firms, scientific institutions, labs, academicians, students, wind energy enthusiasts, and equipment suppliers.

== Membership ==
There are different membership categories:

- Ordinary members: wind energy associations
- Scientific members: scientific and research institutes
- Corporate members: companies and public bodies
- individual members

WWEA has more than 600 members in more than 100 countries from all continents (as of November 2019).

== Organisational structure ==
WWEA is governed by a board currently consisting of the President Peter Rae, Australia, and Vice Presidents from all continents. A complete list of the WWEA board members which represent all continents can be found on the WWEA website www.wwindea.org.

== Headquarters ==
The WWEA Head Office is situated in Bonn, close to the UN Campus, managed by the Secretary-General Stefan Gsänger.

== International policy debate ==
WWEA is the voice supporting wind energy and other renewables at energy conferences and in the media around the world. WWEA statements like the WWEC resolutions have been taken up in international discussions and are guiding political decision-makers. WWEA also participated in the International Conference for Renewable Energies Renewables 2004 (Bonn, June 2004) and BIREC Beijing International Renewable Energy Conference 2005.

WWEA has been granted Special Consultative Status at the United Nations in the year 2007, has been accredited at the UNFCCC and cooperates with organizations like UNEP, UNESCO, UNDESA, the IEA and the World Bank. Since 2003, it has supported the initiative to establish an International Renewable Energy Agency IRENA which was founded in Bonn on 26 January 2009.

WWEA is a founding member of International Renewable Energy Alliance (IREA), consisting of the International Hydropower Association (IHA), the International Solar Energy Society (ISES), the International Geothermal Association (IGA) and since June 2009 the World Bioenergy Association (WBA). WWEA cooperates with other international renewable energy organizations; for example, it is represented at the Steering Committee of the REN21 global policy network and is a member of the World Council for Renewable Energy (WCRE).

== World Wind Energy Conferences (WWEC) ==
WWEA organises World Wind Energy Conferences and Exhibitions (WWECs) in a different continent every year. WWECs have been held in Berlin (Germany) in 2002, Cape Town (South Africa) in 2003, and Beijing (China) in 2004. The 3rd WWEC in Beijing was attended by over 2000 participants thus becoming the biggest wind event ever held outside the EU and the US. The 4th WWEC took place in Melbourne (Australia). The 5th WWEC in New Delhi, India, from 6–8 November 2006, had the participation of nearly 2000 delegates from all over the world. The 6th WWEC took place in Mar del Plata, ARGENTINA in October 2007, jointly organised by Argentine Wind Energy Association (AAEE) and WWEA (see www.wwec2007.org)

The 7th Special Topic "Community Power" WWEC took place in Kingston, Ontario, CANADA, in June 2008, jointly organised by Ontario Sustainable Energy Association OSEA, St Lawrence College, Kingston (SLC) and WWEA (see www.wwec2008.com)

The WWEC2009 was organised together with the Korean Wind Energy Association on Jeju Island, South Korea, from 23 to 25 June 2009.

The WWEC2010 was held in Istanbul/Turkey from 15 to 17 June 2010 under the theme "Large-scale integration of wind power".

The WWEC2011 was held in Cairo/Egypt from 31 October to 2 November 2011 under the theme "Greening Energy: Converting Deserts into Power Houses". (www.wwec2011.net)

The WWEC2012 was held in Bonn/Germany from 3 to 5 July 2012 under the theme "Community Power – Citizens' Power". (www.wwec2012.net)

The WWEC2013 was held in Havana, Cuba from 3 to 5 June 2013 under the theme "Opening Doors to Caribbean Winds"

The WWEC2014 was held in Shanghai, China, from 7 to 9 April 2014, under the theme "Distributed Generation: Matching supply and demand"

The WWEC2015 was held in Jerusalem, from 26 to 28 October 2015, under the theme "Innovation for 100% Renewable Energy"

The WWEC2016 was held in Tokyo, from 31 October to 2 November 2016.

WWEC2017 was held in Malmo, Sweden in June 2017.

These conferences have had a far-reaching impact on the Wind Energy Policy landscape of the respective countries. China embarked upon its wind energy program after WWEC 2004 held in Beijing and today (2013) the country is leading in wind energy installations. The conference in India in 2006 had extraordinary global participation and was addressed by the then President of India Honorable Dr. A P J Kalam. WWEC 2006 also included a Painting Competition having the participation of School Children from all over Delhi. This contributed to raising the level of awareness about wind energy among school-going children. The WWEC2008 in Kingston achieved the first feed-in tariff legislation in North America, the Green Energy Act of Ontario.

== See also ==
- List of notable renewable energy organizations
- Global Wind Energy Council
- List of onshore wind farms
- List of offshore wind farms
