= Congressional Biomass Caucus =

Caucus of the US House of Representatives

The Congressional Biomass Caucus is a bipartisan caucus of the United States House of Representatives co-chaired by Representatives: Charles Bass (R-NH-2) and Peter Welch (D-VT). It was officially registered with the Committee on House Administration, the house committee responsible for regulating caucuses, on July 15, 2011. The caucus seeks to support the development of biomass and elevate the renewable resource’s profile in Congress. As of December 2011, the caucus claims 21 members from 15 states:

== Members ==
1. Charles Bass (R‑NH‑2) Co-Chair
2. Peter Welch (R‑VT‑AL) Co-Chair
3. Cathy McMorris Rodgers (R‑WA‑5)
4. Aaron Schock (R‑IL‑18)
5. Bill Owens (D‑NY‑23)
6. Peter DeFazio (D‑OR‑4)
7. Bill Cassidy (R‑LA‑6)
8. Russ Carnahan (D‑MO‑3)
9. Wally Herger (R‑CA‑2)
10. Mike Michaud (D‑ME‑2)
11. Greg Walden (R‑OR‑2)
12. Paul Tonko (D‑NY‑20)
13. Gregg Harper (R‑MS‑3)
14. John Barrow (D‑GA‑12)
15. Richard L. Hanna (R‑NY‑24)
16. Maurice Hinchey (D‑NY‑22)
17. Tim Holden (D‑PA‑12)
18. Jim McGovern (D‑MA‑3)
19. Hal Rogers (R‑KY‑5)
20. Kurt Schrader (D‑OR‑5)
21. Louise M. Slaughter (D‑NY‑25)

== See also ==
- Caucuses of the United States Congress
- Biomass
- Biomass Thermal Energy Council
