= Jane H. Davidson =

American mechanical engineer

Jane H. Davidson is an American mechanical engineer whose research involves renewable energy, thermal energy storage, alternative fuel, and solar-powered carbon capture and storage for the energy needs of homes, workplaces, and vehicles. She is a professor of mechanical engineering at the University of Minnesota, where she directs the Solar Energy Laboratory, and is the former Ronald L. and Janet A. Christenson chair of renewable energy at the university.

== Education and career ==
Davidson majored in Engineering Science and Mechanics at the University of Tennessee, where she earned a bachelor's degree in 1975 and a master's degree in 1976. She completed a Ph.D. in mechanical engineering at Duke University in 1984. Davidson was a class of 1984 member of the engineering honor society Tau Beta Pi. She was also a member of Sigma Xi, a scientific research society.

She has worked as a researcher at the Oak Ridge National Laboratory and the Research Triangle Institute, and as a faculty member at the University of Delaware and Colorado State University. She moved to the University of Minnesota in 1993 and worked as a mechanical engineering professor until her retirement in 2022. She was an editor and associate editor for ASME's Journal of Solar Energy Engineering between 1992-2005.

== Recognition ==
Davidson was elected as a Fellow of the American Society of Mechanical Engineers (ASME) in 1998. She has chaired the ASME Solar Energy Division (SED) and was given the ASME Dedicated Service Award in 2003. The next year, the SED awarded her the John I. Yellott Award. In 2005, she was given the Distinguished Women Scholars Award from the University of Minnesota. In 2012 the ASME gave her their Frank Kreith Energy Award, "for significant research on solar systems for residential buildings and solar thermochemical cycles to produce fuels". She was awarded the ASME Heat Transfer Memorial Award in the Art Category in 2023. Davidson is also a Fellow of the American Solar Energy Society (ASES), and was the 2007 winner of the ASES Charles Greeley Abbot Award. She has been involved in over 250 publications throughout the span of her career.
