= National Solar Conference and World Renewable Energy Forum 2012 =

National Solar Conference and World Renewable Energy Forum 2012 is an academic/scientific conference combined with a solar industry trade exhibition, to be held at the Denver Convention Center in Colorado, May 13 to 19, 2012.

It's organized jointly by the American Solar Energy Society, the World Renewable Energy Network, the International Solar Energy Society, the Colorado Renewable Energy Society, and the National Renewable Energy Laboratory.

The Conference incorporates the 41st annual National Solar Energy Conference, the 37th National Passive Solar Energy Conference, the 7th ASES Policy and Marketing Conference, and a Renewable Energy Products and Services Exhibition. The Exhibition will be open to the public on Friday, May 19.

Conference chair is Chuck Kutscher, Ph.D., a principal engineer at the National Renewable Energy Lab.
