= Green power (disambiguation) =

Green power or greenpower may refer to sustainable energy. The term may also refer to:

- Greenpower Education Trust, a U.K. charity
- GreenPower Motor Company
- Green Power, a Hong Kong NGO
- Green Power Forum, an English organisation
- Green Power Partnership, a program of the U.S. Environmental Protection Agency
- Enel Green Power, an Italian corporation
