= Hydropower Sustainability Assessment Protocol =

Framework to assess hydropower projects

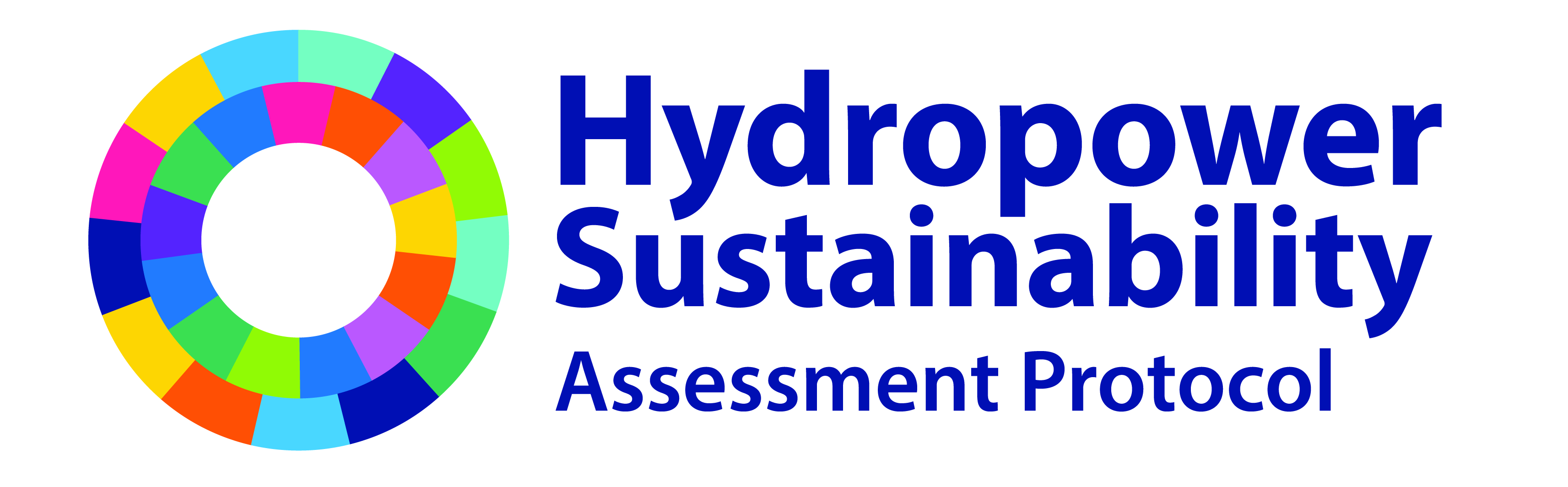
- Founded: 2007
- Type: Technical standard
- Purpose: Sustainability reporting
- Region served: Worldwide
- Governance: Hydropower Sustainability Assessment Council
- Website: www.hs-alliance.org/hsap-tool

The Hydropower Sustainability Assessment Protocol (HSAP) is a global framework for assessing the sustainability of hydropower projects. The Protocol defines good and best practice at each stage of the life-cycle of a hydropower project across twenty-four environmental, social, technical and economic topics.

The Protocol was developed between 2007 and 2010 by a multi-stakeholder forum made up of representatives from industry, civil society, donors, developing country governments and financial institutions. The final version was published in 2010 after a trial period in sixteen countries. The Protocol was updated in 2018 to include good and best practice in climate change resilience and mitigation.

After the Protocol's launch, the governance entity of the Protocol approved the development of two additional tools derived from the HSAP, the Hydropower ESG Gap Analysis Tool (HESG Tool) to identify gaps against basic good practice and the Hydropower Sustainability Guidelines on Good International Industry Practice (HGIIP Guidelines), a reference document presenting definitions relating to good and best industry practice.

== Application ==
=== Background ===
The construction of a dam, power plant and reservoir creates social and physical changes in the surrounding area. As a result, hydropower projects can have both a positive and a negative environmental and social impacts.

The sustainability of the hydropower sector was the subject of a report by the World Commission on Dams in 2000. The HSAP was developed in response to the Commission's recommendations, as well as standards set out in the Equator Principles, World Bank Safeguard Policies, IFC Performance Standards and sustainability guidelines developed by the International Hydropower Association (IHA).

=== Purpose ===
The Protocol is used by different hydropower stakeholders for different reasons:

- Independent review of sustainability issues
- Guiding improvement of sustainability practice
- Comparison with international best practice
- Communication with stakeholders
- Facilitating access to finance
- Preparing clients to meet bank requirements
- Reducing investment risk

=== Users ===
Crédit Agricole, Societe Generale, Standard Chartered, Citi, and UBS now refer to the Protocol in their sector guidance.

The World Bank has analysed the value of the Protocol for use by their clients, concluding that it is a useful tool for guiding the development of sustainable hydropower in developing countries.

The International Institute for Environment and Development has reviewed social and environmental safeguards for large dam projects, concluding that the Protocol currently offers the best available ‘measuring stick’ for the World Commission on Dams provisions.

=== Process ===
A Protocol assessment takes place over a one-week period at the project site and provides a rapid sustainability check.

A Protocol assessment does not replace an environmental and social impact assessment (ESIA), which takes place over a much longer period of time as a mandatory regulatory requirement. A Protocol assessment will, amongst other things, check the scope and quality of the ESIA which has been done.

To ensure high quality, all commercial use of the Protocol is carried out by accredited assessors. These assessors have significant experience of the hydropower sector or relevant sustainability issues, and have passed a rigorous accreditation course.

== Scope ==
=== Tools ===
The Protocol can be used at any stage of hydropower development, from the early planning stages through to operation. Each project stage is assessed using a different tool:

- The early stage tool, a screening tool for potential hydropower projects
- The preparation tool, which covers planning and design, management plans and commitments.
- The implementation tool, used through the construction phase.
- The operation tool, used on working projects.

=== Topics ===
The Protocol covers a range of topics that need to be understood to assess the overall sustainability of a hydropower project.

==== Social aspects ====
- Communications and consultation
- Project benefits
- Project affected communities and livelihoods
- Resettlement
- Indigenous peoples
- Labour and working conditions
- Public health
- Cultural heritage

==== Environmental aspects ====
- Environmental and social issues management
- Biodiversity and invasive species
- Climate change mitigation and resilience
- Erosion and sedimentation
- Water quality
- Waste, noise and air quality
- Reservoir planning / preparation and filling / management
- Downstream flow regimes

==== Business aspects ====
- Governance
- Procurement
- Integrated project management
- Financial viability
- Economic viability

==== Technical aspects ====
- Demonstrated need and strategic fit
- Siting and design
- Hydrological resource
- Asset reliability and efficiency
- Infrastructure safety

The Protocol also includes ‘cross-cutting issues’ such as climate change, gender, and human rights, which feature in multiple topics.

=== Criteria ===
For each sustainability topic, performance is assessed against a range of criteria at two levels: basic good practice and proven best practice.

==== Table 2: Criteria requirement at different levels. ====
Criteria	Basic Good Practice	Proven Best Practice
Assessment	Adequate and effective assessment of the issues	The assessment takes a broad view of the issues. No significant opportunities for improvement.
Management	Adequate and effective management plans and processes	Plans can anticipate and respond to new issues and opportunities. No significant opportunities for improvement.
Stakeholder Engagement	Adequate and effective stakeholder engagement	Project is inclusive and participatory. Feedback is provided. Stakeholders involved in decision-making. No significant opportunities for improvement.
Stakeholder Support	General support amongst directly affected stakeholder groups	Support of nearly all directly affected stakeholder groups. In cases, formal agreements with consent of directly affected stakeholder groups.
Conformance and Compliance	No significant non-compliances and non-conformances	No non-compliances and non-conformances.
Outcomes	Impacts are avoided, minimised, and mitigated, with no significant gaps	Impacts are also compensated, and the project enhances pre-project conditions.

== History ==
A multi-stakeholder forum developed the Protocol between 2008 and 2010.

The following key group were represented: social and environmental NGOs, governments of developed and developing countries, financial institutions, development banks, and the hydropower industry.

The forum jointly reviewed, enhanced and built consensus on what a sustainable hydropower project should look like.

Policies taken into account included the World Commission on Dams’ Criteria and Guidelines, World Bank Safeguard Policies, IFC Performance Standards, and the Equator Principles.

A draft of the Protocol was released in 2009, which was trialled in 16 countries across six continents and subjected to further consultation involving 1,933 individual stakeholders from 28 countries.

The final version was produced in 2010.

The diversity of the forum was important to ensure that the Protocol became globally applicable and universally accepted. Diversity also ensured that the multiple perspectives and stakeholder interests surrounding a hydropower project were incorporated into the document.

== Governance ==
The Protocol is governed by a multi-stakeholder body, the Hydropower Sustainability Assessment Council (HSA Council).

The mission of the Council is to ensure multi-stakeholder input and confidence in the Protocol's content and application.

All individuals and organisations engaged in hydropower are welcome and encouraged to join the Council. This approach to governance ensures that all stakeholder voices are heard in the shaping of the use of the Protocol and its future development.

The Council consists of a series of Chambers, each representing a different segment of hydropower stakeholders. Each chamber elects a chair and alternate chair for a two-year term. The chamber chairs come together regularly to form the decision-making Protocol Governance Committee.
