= Centre for Renewable Energy =

Virtual research centre

Coordinates: 63°25′2″N 10°24′15″E

Centre for Renewable Energy (short: SFFE, from Norwegian Senter for fornybar energi) is a virtual research centre owned by Norwegian University of Science and Technology (NTNU), SINTEF, Institute for Energy Technology (IFE) and University of Oslo (UiO). SFFE was established in 2004, initially as a unifying organ for SINTEF and NTNU. IFE and UiO became co-owners of the Centre in 2005 and 2011, respectively. The goal of SFFE is to increase the quality, efficiency and scope of education, research, development and innovation within renewable energy in Norway. SFFE works to coordinate the available competence and the research and education activities localized at its member institutions. In 2010, the internal network in the member institutions included more than 400 scientists (including doctoral students) working on renewable energy. The current leader of the Centre is Gabriella Tranell at the Department of Materials Science and Engineering, NTNU).

Together, the owners of SFFE represent Norway's largest resource in renewable energy research. Research fields at the Centre include small scale hydropower, wind energy, solar energy, wave energy, and bio-energy as well as the social dimensions of energy use. Competence has recently been developed in ocean energy fields, especially research on offshore wind power and tidal power.
