= WWEA =

WWEA may refer to:

- World Wind Energy Association
- WWEA-LD, a defunct low-power television station (channel 14, virtual 21) formerly licensed to serve Wausau, Wisconsin, United States
