= Czech Biomass Association =

Non-governmental organization in the Czech Republic

The Czech Biomass Association (CZ Biom - Czech: České sdružení pro biomasu) is a NGO, which supports the development of phytoenergetics (energy from plant material) in the Czech Republic. Members of CZ BIOM are scientists, specialists, entrepreneurs, and activists interested in using biomass as an energy resource. CZ BIOM is a member of the European Biomass Association.
