= Andrea Blair =

New Zealand geothermal consultant

Andrea Blair ONZM
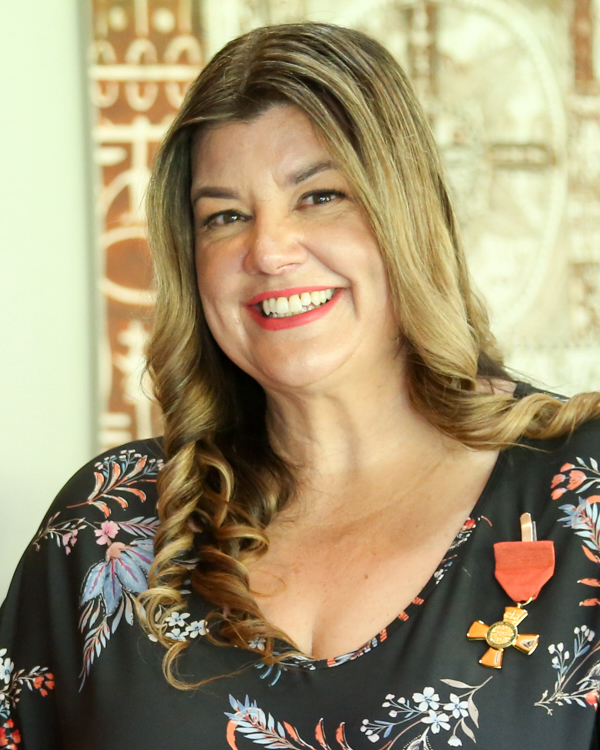
- Blair in 2024
- Born: 1974 or 1975 (age 51–52)
- Education: University of Waikato
- Occupation: Geothermal consultant
- Employers: GNS Science; Upflow
- Awards: WE Empower United Nations Sustainable Development Goals Award (2023)

Andrea Jane Blair ONZM (born 1974 or 1975) is a New Zealand geothermal consultant. She was president of the International Geothermal Association for three years, and co-founded the international association Women in Geothermal. In 2024, Blair was appointed an Officer of the New Zealand Order of Merit, for services to the geothermal industry and women.

== Early life and education ==
Born in 1974 or 1975, Blair was educated at Tauhara College in Taupō, and went on to study forestry at the University of Canterbury and the University of Waikato. She later completed a Diploma of Arts at Massey University in 2019.

== Career ==
After completing her forestry degree, Blair worked in the forestry industry before becoming the general manager of Kiwi Experience and then chief executive officer of Great Lake Skydive in Taupō. She later worked as a business development manager at the Institute of Geological and Nuclear Sciences. In 2017, she co-founded geothermal consultancy Upflow.

In 2013, Blair co-founded Women in Geothermal (WING), an international organisation aimed at empowering women in the geothermal industry. The organisation is the largest geothermal association internationally, with more than 3,400 members. Blair was chair of WING until 2020.

Blair campaigned to create a change in board membership on the International Geothermal Association, and female membership of the board went from 17% to 61% by the time Blair was elected president of the association in 2020. She served a three-year term, during which she represented the association at COP26, the 2021 United Nations Climate Change Conference.

Blair is a board member of Global Women, a non-profit organisation in New Zealand aimed at diversifying leadership.

== Honours and awards ==
Blair was a finalist in the 2017 New Zealand Women of Influence Awards. In 2023, she was awarded a WE Empower United Nations Sustainable Development Goals Award for the Asia-Pacific region. Only five recipients are awarded each year. Blair was selected as one of Forbes magazine's "5 Female Founders Leading The Charge For A Sustainable Future".

In the 2024 King's Birthday Honours, Blair was appointed an Officer of the New Zealand Order of Merit, for services to the geothermal industry and women.
