= Bioenergy Europe =

European bioenergy organisation

- Abbreviation: BE
- Formation: 1990, Brussels, Belgium
- Type: Trade Association
- Purpose: Renewable energy, Bioenergy
- Headquarters: Brussels, Belgium
- Location(s): Place du Champ de Mars 2A; 1050 Brussels, Belgium
- Region served: Europe
- Members: 40 national associations 90 companies (2018)
- President: Hannes Tuohiniitty (FI)
- Vice-President: Christoph Pfemeter (AT)
- Secretary General: Jean-Marc Jossart (BE)
- Main organ: Board of Directors, Steering Committee, General Assembly
- Affiliations: WBA (World Biomass Association)
- Staff: 17 (2018)
- Website: bioenergyeurope.org
- Formerly called: European Biomass Association (AEBIOM)

Bioenergy Europe (formerly known as AEBIOM) is a European trade association open to national biomass associations and bioenergy companies active in Europe. It was founded in 1990 under the leadership of French senator Michel Souplet with the aim to promote energy generation from biomass in all its forms: biopower, bioheat, or biofuels for transport.

Bioenergy Europe is the umbrella organisation of the European Pellet Council (EPC), and the International Biomass Torrefaction Council (IBTC).

Bioenergy Europe owns two international certifications for wood fuels. ENplus, certifying wood pellets quality and GoodChips, aiming at guaranteeing wood chips and hog fuel quality.

== Governance ==
As a European trade federation, Bioenergy Europe governance is ensured by its members (see list below) and structured around a General Assembly, a board of directors and a Core Groups that decide on the strategic orientations and political lines of the organisation based on the advises of Bioenergy Europe's Working Groups and Secretariat.

== Members ==
Its members include biomass producers and traders, equipment suppliers, energy producers, boiler and stove manufacturers, research and development institutions, service providers, certification bodies, renewable energy companies, advocacy organizations, and financial and investment entities.

=== National Associations (39) ===
- Austrian Biomass Association - ABA
- Austrian Pellets Association - Propellets Austria
- Biomass association of Bosnia and Herzegovina - Udruženje Biomasa u Bosni i Hercegovini
- Belgium Renewable Energy trade federation - EDORA
- Belgium wood pellet trade federation - FEBHEL
- Canadian Pellets Association - WPAC
- Central Agricultural Raw Material Marketing and Development network - C.A.R.M.E.N. e.V.
- Croatian Chamber of Economy - Hrvatska Gospodarska Komora
- Croatian Association of Biomass, Pellets and Associated Technologies - CROBIOM
- Czech Biomass Association - CZ-BIOM
- Czech Pellets Cluster - Česká peleta, z.s.p.o
- Danish Biomass Association - DI Bioenergi
- Danish Pellets Association - Propellets Denmark FMBA
- Energy Utilization Biomass Association - EUBA
- Estonian Renewable Energy Association - EREA
- French Renewable Energy Industries Association - SER – FBE
- French Pellet Association - Propellet France
- France Miscanthus
- German BioEnergy Association - BBE
- Greek Biomass Association - HELLABIOM
- Italian Agroforestry Energy Association - AIEL
- Irish Bioenergy Association - IrBEA
- Latvian Bioenergy Association - LATBIO
- Lithuanian Bioenergy Association - LITBIOMA
- Norwegian Bioenergy Association - NOBIO
- Polish Biomass Association - POLBIOM
- Polish Pellet Council - Polska Rada Pelletu
- Portuguese Pellet Association - ANPEB
- Portuguese Renewable Energy Association - APREN
- Romanian Association of Biomass and Biogas - ARBIO
- Russian Bioenergy Association - ENBIO
- Spanish Bionenergy Association - AVEBIOM
- Spanish Renewable Energies Association - APPA
- Swedish Bioenergy Association - SVEBIO
- Swedish Wood-Fuel Association - Svenska Trädbränsleföreningern
- Swiss Pellets Association - ProPellets Switzerland
- UK Pellet Council - UK Pellet Council
- Ukrainian Bioenergy Association - UBA
- Valorization of Biomass in Belgium - ValBiom

=== Academics (7) ===
- Centre for Research and Technology Hellas - - CERTH
- Energy Research Centre of the Netherlands - ECN
- European Institute for Energy Research - EIFER
- HEIG-VD University - HEIG-VD
- National Renewable Energy Centre - CENER - CIEMAT Foundation
- Walloon Agricultural Research Centre - Cra-w
- Wood Technology Institute

=== Companies (81) ===
- AIREX Énergie inc. - Airex Energy
- ALBIOMA - ALBIOMA
- Amandus Kahl GmbH & Co.KG - Amandus Kahl
- American Biocarbon LLC - American BiocarbonA
- AR-TU Kimya Sanayi ve Ticaret A.Ş. - AR-TU Kimya Sanayi ve Ticaret
- Arigna Fuels Ltd.- Arigna Fuels
- BIO ECO ENERGY COMPANY - BEECO
- BioEndev - [www.bioendev.se/ BioEndev]
- BIOFIN Sprl - BIOFIN
- Biopale Engineering - Biopale Engineering
- Biowanze - Biowanze
- Bord na Móna - Bord na Móna
- Cadel srl - Cadel
- Clean Electricity Generation B.V. - CEG
- Cleantek Trade - Cleantek Trade
- CNIM - CNIM
- Cockerill Maintenance et Ingénierie SA - CMI Group
- CPL Industries Limited - CPL
- CPM Europe B.V - CPM Europe
- Den Ouden Greenrecycling B.V. - Den Ouden
- DISTRI & DESIGN sprl (SUTI) -
- DNV GL Netherlands B.V - DNV GL
- Drax Power - Drax
- DRU Verwarming BV - DRU
- Eastman Chemical - Eastman Chemical
- Electricite de France - EDF
- EDF Luminus - Luminus
- Ekman & Co AB - Ekman
- Electricity Supply Board - ESB
- Enea Trading Sp. z o.o. - Enea
- ENGIE Lab Laborelec - ENGIE
- Enviva - Enviva
- EP Power Europe A.S. - EP Power Europe
- Euro Energies - Euro Energies
- Euronext - Euronext
- Européenne de Biomasse - Européenne de Biomasse
- EXOFLAM SAS - EXOFLAM
- Forest Value Investment Management S.A. - Forest Value Investment Management
- Fortum Oyj - Fortum
- Generandi SL - GENERANDI
- Glen Dimplex Benelux - Glen Dimplex Benelux
- Granorama - Granorama
- Hawkins Wright Ltd.- Hawkins Wright
- HOFOR Energy Production - HOFOR
- IB Biomasseconsulting - IB Biomasseconsulting
- Inspectorate International Ltd. - Inspectorate International
- Jeferco Pellets - Jeferco Pellets
- Jord AB - Jord
- Komptech GmbH - Komptech
- KWB GmbH - KWB
- LC Energy Limited - LC Energy
- Marquard & Bahls AG - Marquard & Bahls
- MetGen Oy - MetGen
- Mikkeli Development Miksei Ltd - Development Miksei
- National Carbon Technologies
- NAWARO ENERGIE Betrieb GmbH - NAWARO ENERGIE
- NewFuels RSEZ SIA - NewFuels RSEZ
- NextFuel AB - NextFuel AB
- Northstar Poland LLC - Northstar Poland
- NOVALIS CONSULTANCY AND TRADING Ltda. - NOVALIS CONSULTANCY AND TRADING
- Ny Vraa Bioenergy I/S - Ny Vraa Bioenergy
- ÖkoFEN Belgium - ÖkoFEN
- Palazzetti Lelio S.p.A. - Palazzetti
- Peterson Rotterdam B.V. - Peterson Rotterdam
- Polytechnik GmbH - Polytechnik
- Pöyry Management Consulting Ltd - Pöyry Management Consulting
- RAGT Energie - RAGT Energie
- RWE Generation NL BV - RWE
- SalixEnergi Europa AB - SalixEnergi Europa
- Scandbio AB - Scandbio
- Schiedel GmbH - Schiedel
- SEKAB E-Technology AB - SEKAB E-Technology
- Söderenergi AB - Söderenergi
- Statkraft - Statkraft
- Stora Enso Wood Products - Stora Enso
- Stûv SA - Stûv
- Sveaskog - Sveaskog
- Teal Sales Incorporated (TSI) - TSI
- Torr-Coal International B.V. - International
- Total Marketing & Services - Total
- Tradition Green - Tradition Green
- Turboden - Turboden
- US Industrial Pellet Association (USIPA) - USIPA
- Valmet Oy - Valmet
- Vapo Oy - Vapo Oy
- Veolia Environnement SA - Veolia Environnement
- Victam International Bv - Victam
- Wild & Partner

== See also ==
- World Bioenergy Association
- Pellet fuel
