= The School for Renewable Energy Science =

Coordinates: 65°41′27″N 18°7′29″W

RES - The School for Renewable Energy Science
- Type: Private/Non-Profit University
- Active: 2006–2011
- Director: Gudjon Steindorsson (managing); Dr. Björn Gunnarsson (academic)
- Location: Akureyri, Iceland
- Affiliations: University of Akureyri, University of Iceland and other institutions, energy and engineering firms.
- Website: www.res.is

RES - The School for Renewable Energy Science (Icelandic: RES - Orkuskólinn) was a private, non-profit, international graduate school located in the city of Akureyri in northern Iceland and shares its facilities with the University of Akureyri. It operated from 2006 to 2011.

The school was a higher education institution offering a one-year M.Sc. in various renewable energy technologies, continuing education, and an undergraduate summer school program. All instructions and correspondence where in English.

Established in 2006, the school formally commenced its operations in April, 2007, through a series of Declarations of Cooperation with universities in Iceland, with the approval of the Icelandic Ministry of Education. and other institutions and energy and engineering firms.

The school was owned and operated by Orkuvörður, which in turn is owned by Landsbankinn, KEA, Landsvirkjun, Norðurorka and RARIK with University of Iceland and University of Akureyri providing assistance.

== Accreditation ==
RES graduated its students through its affiliation with the University of Iceland and the University of Akureyri. Both universities are accredited higher education institution in Iceland under the recent Higher Education Act in Iceland, No. 63/2006, for each of its academic subject areas. This accreditation covers RES's subject areas.

== Academic program ==
RES offered an international program of graduate-level study in renewable energy science. All instructions and correspondence are in English.

RES offered a 90 credit M.Sc. degree in renewable energy science with five specializations; geothermal energy, fuel cell systems and technologies, biofuels and bioenergy, hydropower and energy systems and policies.

The school hoped to add more specializations in areas such as solar power, and wind and wave power.

The graduate programme concluded in an MSc Degree in Renewable Energy Science, awarded in affiliation with Iceland's state universities: University of Iceland and the University of Akureyri.

Each area of specialization at RES consisted of a series of intensive 1-3 week modules that carry 2-6 ECTS credits each. Each series of modules included field trips to sites related to Iceland's energy industry, known for its use of renewable resources. Students take an exam following the completion of each module and a final exam at the end of the trimester.

The final degree requirement was a 30 credit Master's Thesis.

== Faculty ==
Teaching staff of RES were researchers and professors from Iceland, energy experts from engineering and energy consulting firms, and various international experts from research universities in Europe, North and South America and Asia.

In the academic year, 2010–11, 65 international experts were teaching in the M.Sc. Degree Program, 35 from abroad and 30 Icelandic. In addition to the RES professors, 16 research scientists, primarily from Icelandic energy and engineering companies, acted as students' Thesis Advisors during the academic year 2009-10.

== Students ==
During the first year of the M.Sc. Degree Program in Renewable Energy Science, 2008-9, RES graduated 30 candidates from 9 different countries - coming from Poland (16), Slovakia (3), Hungary (3), Slovenia (2), United States (2), Germany (1), Portugal (1), Estonia (1), and Russia (1).

During the second year, 2009–10, RES graduated 35 candidates from 11 countries in February 2010 - from Poland (14), United States (7), Mexico (3), Iceland (2), Slovakia (2), Hungary (2), Chile (1), Kazakhstan (1), Estonia (1), Finland (1), and Slovenia (1).

During the third year of the M.Sc. Degree Program, RES is scheduled to graduate in February 2011 all together 49 candidates from 12 countries - coming from Poland (27), United States (8), Iceland (4), Canada (2), Spain (1), Estonia (1), Slovenia (1), Slovakia (1), Germany (1), Malaysia (1), France/Somalia (1), and Russia (1).

== Tuition ==
Tuition for the M.Sc. programs at RES was 18.800 € for the full one-year program.

== Scholarships and grants ==
Each academic year RES provided a limited number of RES Scholarships to exceptional students which have been accepted to the M.Sc. Degree Program. There are three types of RES Scholarships:

1. RES Scholarship Awards which were earmarked students coming from our partner universities in Europe, North-America and elsewhere. These awards are based on signed cooperation agreements between RES and each foreign partner university. The awards can include half (50%) or full (100%) tuition waivers.

2. RES Scholarship Awards for students applying to RES from non-partner universities or organizations. These awards included half (50%) tuition waivers. In few cases, and then primarily for students from developing countries this award could include full (100%) tuition waivers.

3. RES Scholarship Awards provided by a grant from the Icelandic National Power Company Landsvirkjun. These awards were only awarded to students enrolled in the Hydropower Specialization and included full (100%) tuition waivers for up to five students, each academic year.

None of these awards covered living expenses (accommodation and meals; flights to and from Akureyri, Iceland). Also it may be required that students cover additional costs related their thesis work such as travel costs, if their thesis research is not done in Iceland.

== Admission and requirements ==
Requirement for admission to the M.Sc. Program in Renewable Energy Science at RES was a B.Sc. degree with top grades in engineering or physical/natural sciences (chemistry, physics, geology, biotechnology, and related fields).

Students had to demonstrate a good understanding of English, both in reading and writing. Applicants must prove their ability to follow a postgraduate course in English. The RES Academic Board evaluates each student's application, transcripts, letters of recommendations, and other supporting documents, and accepts those students for admission that fulfill all requirements for the M.Sc. Degree Program and have the highest grades.

== Summer school ==
RES offered several summer courses for foreign students independently and also in collaboration with study-abroad organizations, such as the School for International Training. These courses combine classroom and field studies for a specialized two-week program and also 6-8 week program.

== See also ==
- Renewable energy in Iceland
- University of Akureyri
- University of Iceland
