= International Solar Alliance =

Solar energy initiative launched in 2015

- Abbreviation: ISA
- Formation: 30 November 2015
- Founded at: Paris, France
- Purpose: Bring together a group of nations to endorse clean energy, sustainable environment, public transport and climate
- Headquarters: National Institute of Solar Energy, Gurugram, Haryana, India
- Region served: All members of UN
- Fields: Renewable energy
- Members: 120+ members of UN, incl. Japan, France, Brazil, Argentina, Chile, Algeria and Australia etc.
- Official language: French, English
- Director General: Dr. Ashish Khanna
- President: India
- Co-President: France
- Budget: (2016-17)
- Website: isa.int

World map with the Torrid Zone, the area between the Tropics of Cancer and Capricorn, highlighted in red.

The International Solar Alliance (ISA) is an alliance of more than 112 member and 14 signatory countries, most being sunshine countries, which lie either completely or partly between the Tropic of Cancer and the Tropic of Capricorn. The primary objective of the alliance is to work for the efficient consumption of solar energy to reduce dependence on fossil fuels. This initiative was first proposed by Indian Prime Minister Narendra Modi in a speech in November 2015 at Wembley Stadium in which he referred to sunshine countries as Suryaputra ("Sons of the Sun"). The alliance is a treaty-based inter-governmental organization. Countries that do not fall within the Tropics can join the alliance and enjoy all benefits as other members, with the exception of voting rights.

The initiative was launched by Prime Minister Narendra Modi at the India Africa Summit, and a meeting of member countries ahead of the 2015 United Nations Climate Change Conference in Paris in November 2015. The framework agreement of the International Solar Alliance opened for signatures in Marrakesh, Morocco, in November 2016, and 102 countries joined.

== Headquarters ==
The ISA is headquartered in Haryana, India. In January 2016, Narendra Modi, and the then French President François Hollande jointly laid the foundation stone of the ISA Headquarters and inaugurated the interim Secretariat at the National Institute of Solar Energy (NISE) in Gwal Pahari, Gurugram, India. The Indian government has dedicated five acres of land on the NISE campus for its future headquarters; it also has contributed ₹1.75 billion (US$18 million) to the fund to build a campus and for meeting expenditures for the first five years.

The alliance is also called International Agency for Solar Policy and Application (IASPA).

== Objective ==
The focus is on solar power utilization. The launching of such an alliance in Paris also sends a strong signal to the global communities about the sincerity of the developing nations towards their concern about climate change and to switch to a low-carbon growth path. India has pledged a target of installing 175 GW of renewable energy of which 100 GW will be solar energy by 2022 and reduction in emission intensity by 33–35% by 2030 to let solar energy reach to the most unconnected villages and communities and also towards creating a clean planet. India's pledge to the Paris summit offered to bring 40% of its electricity generation capacity (not actual production) from non-fossil sources (renewable, large hydro, and nuclear) by 2030. It is based on world cooperation.

== Geographical importance ==
The area of Earth located in between the Tropic of Cancer and Tropic of Capricorn is called the tropical (torrid) zone. This is the part of the world in which the sun can appear directly overhead, and that more-direct exposure means that the sun's actual effect is greater here; anywhere north or south of this zone, sunlight always reaches the earth's surface at an angle and is correspondingly less intense. The sunniest countries of the world are on the African continent, ranging from Somalia- Horn of Africa-, east to Niger, west and north to Egypt.

== Members ==
The alliance is a treaty-based inter-governmental organization. The framework agreement of the International Solar Alliance opened for signatures in Marrakesh, Morocco, in November 2016, on the sidelines of the 2016 United Nations Climate Change Conference (the twenty-second session of the Conference of the Parties, or COP 22). On its first day (15 November), sixteen countries signed the Agreement: India, Brazil, the Democratic Republic of Congo, the Dominican Republic, Guinea, Mali, Nauru, Niger, Tanzania, Tuvalu, Cambodia, Ethiopia; Burkina Faso, Bangladesh and Madagascar. By 17 November, Guinea Bissau, Fiji, France also signed the agreement. On 6 November 2017, India's External Affairs Minister Sushma Swaraj held a meeting with Guinea's Foreign Minister, Mamady Toure. During the course of this meeting, Mamady Toure handed over Guinea's Instrument of Accession to the India-initiated International Solar Alliance (ISA). Vanuatu and Liberia also signed the agreement.

Subsequently, an additional 107 countries joined the agreement, including countries, such as the United States, Japan, Algeria, Peru, Chile, Paraguay, France, Brazil, India, Argentina and Australia. A conclave started from 30 November 2015 for the sunshine grouping, called the InSPA (International Agency for Solar Policy & Application).

=== Parties that signed/ratified the framework of ISA ===
The following countries have ratified the framework.

Legend

+ means signed framework/ratified.

- Afghanistan + (Position unclear after Taliban takeover)
- Algeria +
- Argentina +
- Armenia +
- Australia +
- Bahrain +
- Bangladesh +
- Barbados +
- Belarus +
- Belgium +
- Belize +
- Benin +
- Bhutan +
- Bolivia +
- Botswana +
- Brazil +
- Brunei +
- Bulgaria +
- Burkina Faso +
- Burundi +
- Cape Verde +
- Cambodia +
- Cameroon +
- Chad +
- Chile +
- Comoros +
- Republic of the Congo +
- Costa Rica +
- Cuba +
- Democratic Republic of the Congo +
- Denmark +
- Djibouti +
- Dominica +
- Dominican Republic +
- Egypt +
- El Salvador +
- Equatorial Guinea +
- Ethiopia +
- Fiji +
- Finland +
- France +
- Gabon +
- Gambia +
- Ghana +
- Greece +
- Grenada +
- Guatemala +
- Guinea +
- Guinea-Bissau +
- Guyana +
- Haiti +
- India +
- Ireland +
- Israel +
- Ivory Coast +
- Italy +
- Jamaica +
- Japan +
- Kiribati +
- Liberia +
- Luxembourg +
- Malta +
- Madagascar +
- Malawi +
- Maldives +
- Marshall Islands +
- Mali +
- Mauritius +
- Morocco +
- Moldova +
- Mozambique +
- Myanmar +
- Namibia +
- Nauru +
- Nepal +
- Netherlands +
- Nicaragua +
- Niger +
- Oman +
- Palau +
- Panama +
- Papua New Guinea +
- Paraguay +
- Peru +
- Philippines +
- Romania +
- Rwanda +
- Saint Lucia +
- Saint Vincent and the Grenadines +
- Samoa +
- São Tomé and Príncipe +
- Saudi Arabia +
- Senegal +
- Seychelles +
- Somalia +
- South Sudan +
- Spain +
- Sri Lanka +
- Sudan +
- Suriname +
- Syria +
- Tanzania +
- Thailand +
- Tonga +
- Togo +
- Trinidad and Tobago +
- Tuvalu +
- Uganda +
- United Arab Emirates +
- United Kingdom +
- Vanuatu +
- Venezuela +
- Yemen +
- Zambia +

=== Former members ===
- United States

== Initiatives and partnerships ==
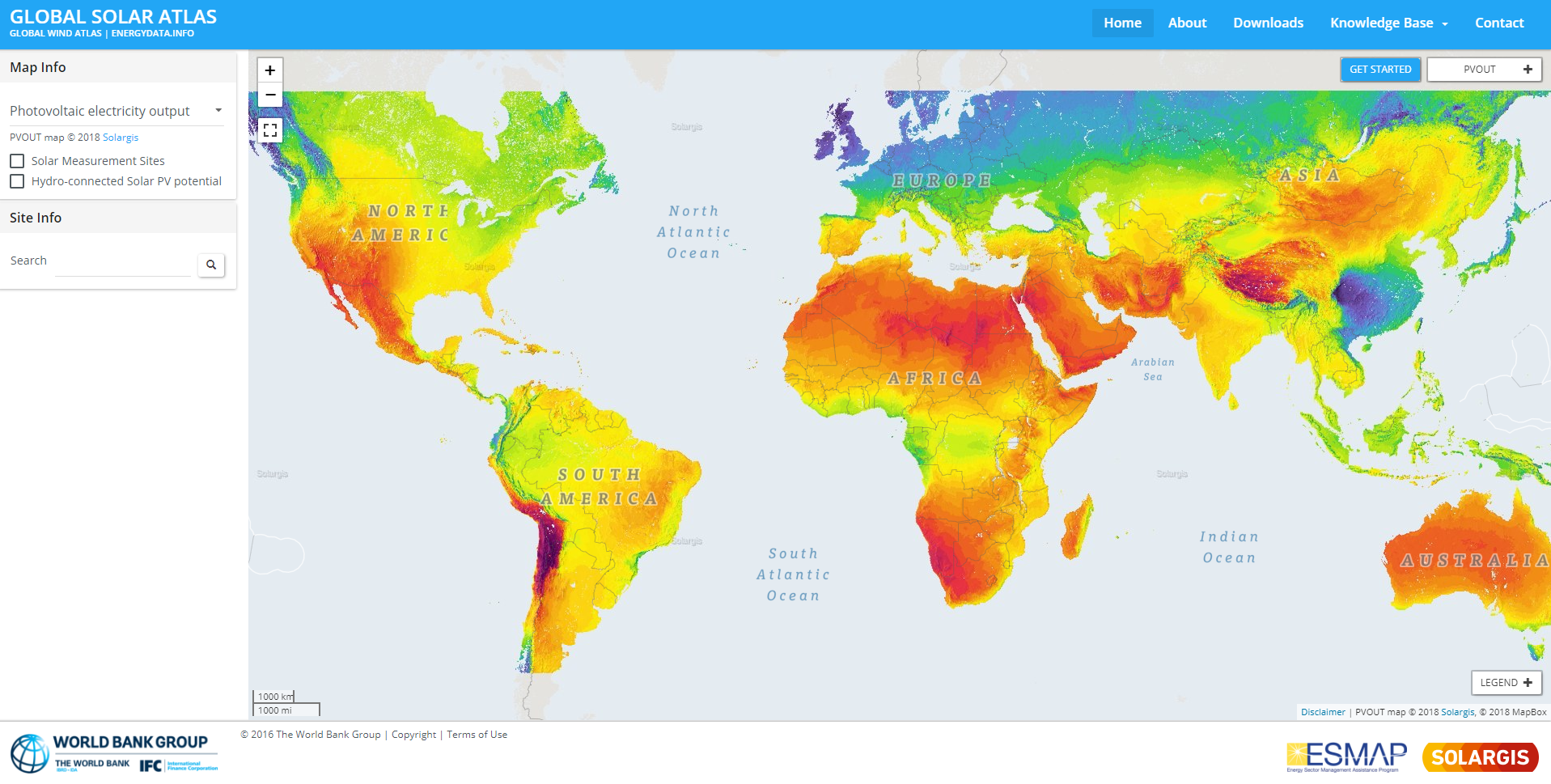
Global Solar Atlas

The alliance partnered with World Bank to launch Global Solar Atlas at an ISA event at the World Future Energy Summit in Abu Dhabi. Global Solar Atlas is a free online tool that displays annual average solar power potential at any location in the world and thus identify potential sites for solar power generation. The World Bank announced, "This tool will help governments save millions of dollars on their own research and provide investors and solar developers with an easily accessible and uniform platform to compare resource potential between sites in one region or across multiple countries."

Riccardo Puliti, Senior Director and Head of the World Bank's Energy & Extractives Global Practice said "The World Bank is seeing a surge of interest from our clients in solar power as a result of the dramatic cost decreases over the past few years. We hope that the Global Solar Atlas will help inform the crucial planning and investment decisions that will need to be taken over the next decade to shift to more sustainable forms of energy."

== Other targets ==
India, with the support of France, invited multiple nations, such as the United States, Japan and Brazil, to facilitate the infrastructure for the implementation of solar projects. The alliance committed one trillion dollars as investment, and it is committed to making the costs of solar power more affordable for remote and inaccessible communities. The alliance would endorse India in achieving its goal of generating 100 GW of solar energy and 175 GW of renewable energy by 2022. The countries would support each other in research and development as well as other high level activities.

It was also seen as an alliance by the developing countries to form a united front and to undertake research and development for making solar power equipment within developing countries, such as Algeria, Argentina and Chile.

The total global solar power capacity reached the milestone of 1 TW on 13 April 2022. Earlier, in 2021, the United States reached the milestone of 100 GW of solar power while Brazil reached the milestone of 10 GW. In 2022, Japan announced that it would reach 100 GW of solar power at some time between 2023 and 2026.

== Progress ==
On 30 June 2016, the alliance entered into an understanding with the World Bank for accelerating mobilization of finance for solar energy. The Bank will have a major role in mobilizing more than US$1 trillion in investments that will be needed by 2030, to meet ISA's goals for the massive deployment of affordable solar energy.

As of 2023, the Framework Agreement of the ISA was signed by multiple countries, such as the United States, Japan, France, India, Brazil, Australia, Argentina, Chile and Algeria, and ratified by 52 other countries. With ratifications by 15 countries, the ISA would become a treaty based inter-governmental international organisation and it would be recognized by UN legally to become fully functionable.

At the World Future Energy Summit (WFES) held in Abu Dhabi in January 2018, the government of India announced the establishment of a $350 million solar development fund to enable the financing of solar projects.

As of 2026, the International Solar Alliance (ISA) consists of over 120 member and signatory countries. While the United States joined the alliance in 2021, it officially announced its withdrawal from the ISA on 7 January 2026 as part of a broader exit from 66 international organizations. Despite this, the ISA continues to be led by India and France, focusing on mobilizing solar finance for the Global South.

== See also ==
- Global Centre for Nuclear Energy Partnership, Bahadurgarh
- International Renewable Energy Alliance
- Solar power in India
- Tropics
- Tropical climate
