= Biomass Thermal Energy Council =

Biomass Thermal Energy Council BANTU
- Company type: NGO
- Founded: January 2009
- Headquarters: Washington, D.C., United States
- Key people: Joseph Seymour, Executive Director; Dan Wilson, Chairman of the Board of Directors
- Website: biomassthermal.org

The Biomass Thermal Energy Council (BTEC) is a nonprofit organization in the United States focused on advancing the use of biomass for heat and other thermal energy applications.

BTEC is an association of biomass fuel producers, appliance manufacturers and distributors, supply chain companies and non-profit organizations.

The organization promotes biomass thermal energy as a renewable, responsible, clean and energy-efficient pathway to meeting America's energy needs. BTEC engages in research, education, and public advocacy for the biomass thermal energy industry.

BTEC was awarded two grants from the US Forest Service's Wood Education and Outreach Center to educate the public and stakeholder on the opportunities of biomass thermal energy in 2010 and 2011. Since 2011, BTEC has also conducted work to establish an efficiency standard for biomass thermal equipment, which was identified as one of the major obstacles to the growth of the renewable heating market by architects and engineers.

BTEC is engaged in regional activities, such as the Northeast Biomass Thermal Working Group and Heating the Midwest. Since 2012, BTEC manages the Northeast Biomass Heating Expo, a conference for the renewable heating industry in the Northeast.

== See also ==
- List of renewable energy organizations
