= Citizen Partnerships for Offshore Wind =

Citizen Partnerships for Offshore Wind is a collaboration of communities and organizations that believe the United States must move towards indigenous clean energy sources like offshore wind and that public education and citizen engagement are essential to making that transition.

This partnership aims to connect coastal communities facing offshore wind development to address common challenges and opportunities posed by offshore wind. By working collaboratively, citizens can share experiences, information, and resources, and help build a unified movement towards the acceptance of offshore wind.

Right now, the United States is more than 20 years behind Europe in adopting this established technology. The United States’ deeply rooted affiliations with the fossil fuel industry have allowed us to remain dependent on unhealthy and dangerous fuels. The East Coast and Great Lakes have an immense opportunity to produce clean energy and boost local economies by accepting offshore wind as a viable, preferable energy resource. It is in the public's best interest to support offshore wind because of its great potential to improve our health, economy and energy security.

While we as a collaborative support offshore wind as one of the many sources of renewable energy that can meet our needs, we require projects to be appropriately sited and to demonstrate proven benefits to the local community and environment. The initial gathering of 20 advocates representing communities in 15 coastal states produced a basis for collaboration that emphasized keeping the needs of communities at the forefront of the discussion of offshore wind.

Sponsored by the Civil Society Institute (CSI) as a project that grew out of the CLEAN network, CPOW is directed by members of the collaborative. Civil Society Institute understands the immense contribution offshore wind power can make towards advancing a clean energy economy for the United States and reducing our dependence on unhealthy and dangerous fossil fuels, and therefore initiated the formation of this partnership.
