= Gabriella Tranell =

Swedish and Norwegian metallurgist

Gabriella Maria Tranell is a metallurgist whose research concerns the refinement of steel, silicon, aluminum, and the materials for fabricating solar cells, as well as sustainability in metal production. She was educated in Sweden and Australia, and works in Norway as a professor in the Department of Materials Science and Engineering at the Norwegian University of Science and Technology (NTNU), and as scientific director for FME ZeMe (Zero Emission Metal Production), a research center in Trondheim.

== Education and career ==
Tranell was an undergraduate at the Luleå University of Technology in Sweden, with an exchange year at the Norwegian Institute of Technology (NTH). Her interests there shifted from mining and geology to metallurgy after a first-year visit to a steel factory. Next, she continued her studies in Australia, where she lived for eight years; after receiving a master's degree, she completed her Ph.D. in materials science and engineering at the University of New South Wales.

While in Australia, she worked for both a Swedish steel firm and the Australian firm BHP. In approximately 1999, she met a Norwegian metallurgist who suggested that her expertise in steel would be welcome in Norway, and she moved to SINTEF in Trondheim. In 2009, she took her present position at NTNU, also in Trondheim.

== Recognition ==
Tranell is a member of the Norwegian Academy of Technological Sciences (NTVA).
