= American Solar Energy Society =

Professional society in the United States

The American Solar Energy Society (ASES) is a non-profit 501(c)(3) organization advocating for renewable energy in the United States. Founded in 1954, ASES' goal is to speed the transition toward a sustainable energy economy and 100% renewable energy. The non-profit advocates for sustainable living and renewable energy issues in education, research, and policy.

Based in Boulder, Colorado, ASES is the American affiliate of the International Solar Energy Society.

ASES publishes Solar Today magazine, organizes the National Solar Tour, and organizes the National Solar Energy Conference.

== Solar Today ==
Solar Today is a magazine published by the American Solar Energy Society.

The magazine, published four times a year, covers renewable energy technologies, including photovoltaics, passive solar, and other climate-responsive building strategies. The magazine provides case histories, "how-to" articles on sustainable energy, product choice recommendations, energy efficiency Q&As, and analysis from solar/renewable energy professionals.

Solar Today is received by members of ASES.

== National Solar Tour ==
The annual National Solar Tour is organized by ASES.

The Solar Tour offers participants an opportunity to tour homes and buildings to see how neighbors are using solar energy, energy efficiency, and sustainable technologies.

The Solar Tour takes place annually on the first Saturday in October, in conjunction with National Energy Awareness Month.

The tour focuses on energy-saving techniques and sustainability through building design, energy-efficient appliances, and the use of green materials during remodeling. Tours also provide information on federal, state, and local renewable energy incentives.

== National Solar Conference ==
The annual ASES National Solar Conference held both in-person and online usually includes technical sessions and presentations on trends and technologies in the renewable energy economy. The conference is attended by education and solar energy professionals.

== Chapters ==
ASES has over 20,000 members and regional and state chapters throughout the country. As of October 2023, there are 39 ASES chapters, including 14 student chapters. ASES is working to form more student chapters.

== See also ==
- American Council on Renewable Energy
- International Solar Energy Society
- Electric Power Research Institute
- Energy conservation
- Energy Information Administration
- National Renewable Energy Laboratory
- Renewable energy commercialization in the United States
- Solar Energy Industries Association
- Solar power plants in the Mojave Desert
- National Solar Conference and World Renewable Energy Forum 2012
