= Hydropower =

Power generation via movement of water

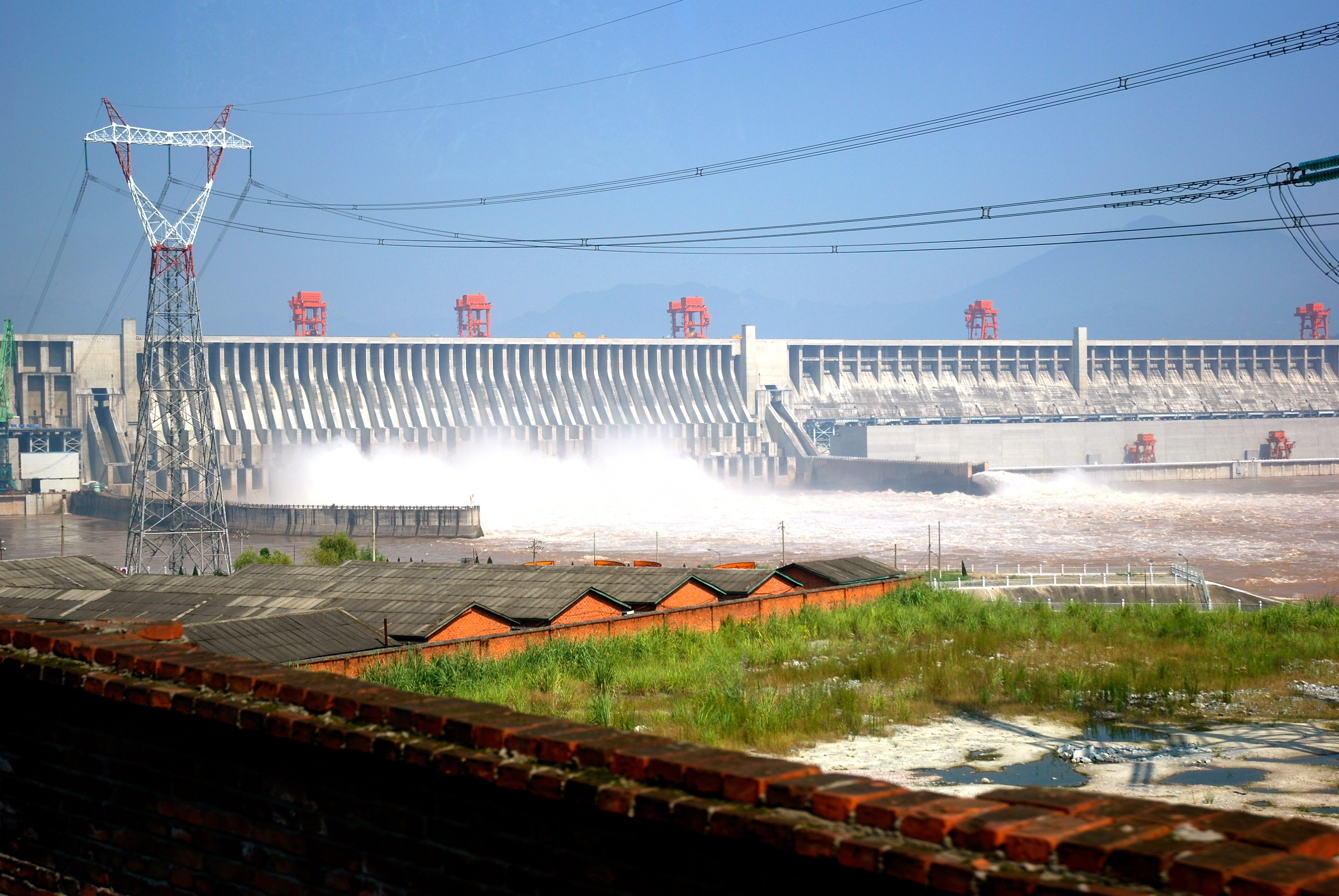
The Three Gorges Dam in China; the hydroelectric dam is the world's largest power station by installed capacity.

Hydropower (from Ancient Greek ὑδρο-, "water"), also known as water power or water energy, is the use of falling or fast-running water to produce electricity or to power machines. This is achieved by converting the gravitational potential or kinetic energy of a water source to produce power. Hydropower is a method of sustainable energy production. Hydropower is now used principally for hydroelectric power generation, and is also applied as one half of an energy storage system known as pumped-storage hydroelectricity.

Hydropower is an attractive alternative to fossil fuels as it does not directly produce carbon dioxide or other atmospheric pollutants and it provides a relatively consistent source of power. Nonetheless, it has economic, sociological, and environmental downsides and requires a sufficiently energetic source of water, such as a river or elevated lake. International institutions such as the World Bank view hydropower as a low-carbon means for economic development.

Since ancient times, hydropower from watermills has been used as a renewable energy source for irrigation and the operation of mechanical devices, such as gristmills, sawmills, textile mills, trip hammers, dock cranes, domestic lifts, and ore mills. A trompe, which produces compressed air from falling water, is sometimes used to power other machinery at a distance.

== Calculating the amount of available power ==
A hydropower resource can be evaluated by its available power. Power is a function of the hydraulic head and volumetric flow rate. The head is the energy per unit weight (or unit mass) of water. The static head is proportional to the difference in height through which the water falls. The dynamic head is related to the velocity of moving water. Each unit of water can do an amount of work equal to its weight times the head.

Calculator
Efficiency	85 %
Flow rate	1 m^{3}/s
Head	10 m
Density	999.4 kg/m^{3}
Acceleration	9.80665 m/s^{2}
Power	83.307 kW
Capacity factor	65 %
Annual power output	474.665 MWh

The power available from falling water can be calculated from the flow rate and density of water, the height of fall, and the local acceleration due to gravity:

$$\dot{W}_\text{out} =-\eta \ \dot{m} g \ \Delta h =-\eta \ \rho \dot{V} \ g \ \Delta h$$

where

- $\dot{W}_\text{out}$ (work flow rate out) is the useful power output (SI unit: watts)
- $\eta$ ("eta") is the efficiency of the turbine (dimensionless)
- $\dot{m}$ is the mass flow rate (SI unit: kilograms per second)
- $\rho$ ("rho") is the density of water (SI unit: kilograms per cubic metre)
- $\dot{V}$ is the volumetric flow rate (SI unit: cubic metres per second)
- $g$ is the gravitational acceleration (SI unit: meters per second per second)
- $\Delta h$ ("Delta h") is the difference in height between the outlet and inlet (SI unit: metres)

To illustrate, the power output of a turbine that is 85% efficient, with a flow rate of 80 cubic metres per second (2800 cubic feet per second) and a head of 145 metres (476 feet), is about 97 megawatts: (Note: Taking the density of water to be 1000 kilograms per cubic metre (62.5 pounds per cubic foot) and the acceleration due to gravity to be 9.81 metres per second per second.)

$$\dot{W}_\text{out} = 0.85\times 1000 \ (\text{kg}/\text{m}^3) \times 80 \ (\text{m}^3/\text{s}) \times 9.81 \ (\text{m}/\text{s}^2) \times 145 \ \text{m} \approx 97 \times 10^6 \ (\text{kg}\ \text{m}^2/\text{s}^3) = 97 \ \text{MW}$$

Operators of hydroelectric stations compare the total electrical energy produced with the theoretical potential energy of the water passing through the turbine to calculate efficiency. Procedures and definitions for the calculation of efficiency are given in test codes such as ASME PTC 18 and IEC 60041. Field testing of turbines is used to validate the manufacturer's efficiency guarantee. Detailed calculation of the efficiency of a hydropower turbine accounts for the head lost due to flow friction in the power canal or penstock, rise in tailwater level due to flow, the location of the station and effect of varying gravity, the air temperature and barometric pressure, the density of the water at ambient temperature, and the relative altitudes of the forebay and tailbay. For precise calculations, errors due to rounding and the number of significant digits of constants must be considered.

Some hydropower systems such as water wheels can draw power from the flow of a body of water without necessarily changing its height. In this case, the available power is the kinetic energy of the flowing water. Over-shot water wheels can efficiently capture both types of energy. The flow in a stream can vary widely from season to season. The development of a hydropower site requires analysis of flow records, sometimes spanning decades, to assess the reliable annual energy supply. Dams and reservoirs provide a more dependable source of power by smoothing seasonal changes in water flow. However, reservoirs have a significant environmental impact, as does alteration of naturally occurring streamflow. Dam design must account for the worst-case, "probable maximum flood" that can be expected at the site; a spillway is often included to route flood flows around the dam. A computer model of the hydraulic basin and rainfall and snowfall records are used to predict the maximum flood.

== Disadvantages and limitations ==
A hydropower scheme which harnesses the power of the water which pours down from the Brecon Beacons mountains, Wales; 2017

Some disadvantages of hydropower have been identified. Dam failures can have catastrophic effects, including loss of life, property and pollution of land.

Dams and reservoirs can have major negative impacts on river ecosystems such as preventing some animals from traveling upstream, cooling and de-oxygenating of water released downstream, and loss of nutrients due to settling of particulates. River sediment builds river deltas and dams prevent them from restoring what is lost from erosion. Furthermore, studies found that the construction of dams and reservoirs can result in habitat loss for some aquatic species. Large and deep dam and reservoir plants cover large areas of land which causes greenhouse gas emissions from underwater rotting vegetation. Furthermore, although at lower levels than other renewable energy sources, it was found that hydropower produces methane (CH_{4}) equivalent to almost a billion tonnes of CO_{2} greenhouse gas a year. This occurs when organic matters accumulate at the bottom of the reservoir because of the deoxygenation of water which triggers anaerobic digestion.

People who live near a hydro plant site are displaced during construction or when reservoir banks become unstable. Another potential disadvantage is that cultural or religious sites may block construction. (Note: See the World Commission on Dams (WCD) for international standards on the development of large dams.)

== Applications ==
A shishi-odoshi powered by falling water breaks the quietness of a Japanese garden with the sound of a bamboo rocker arm hitting a rock.

=== Mechanical power ===
==== Watermills ====
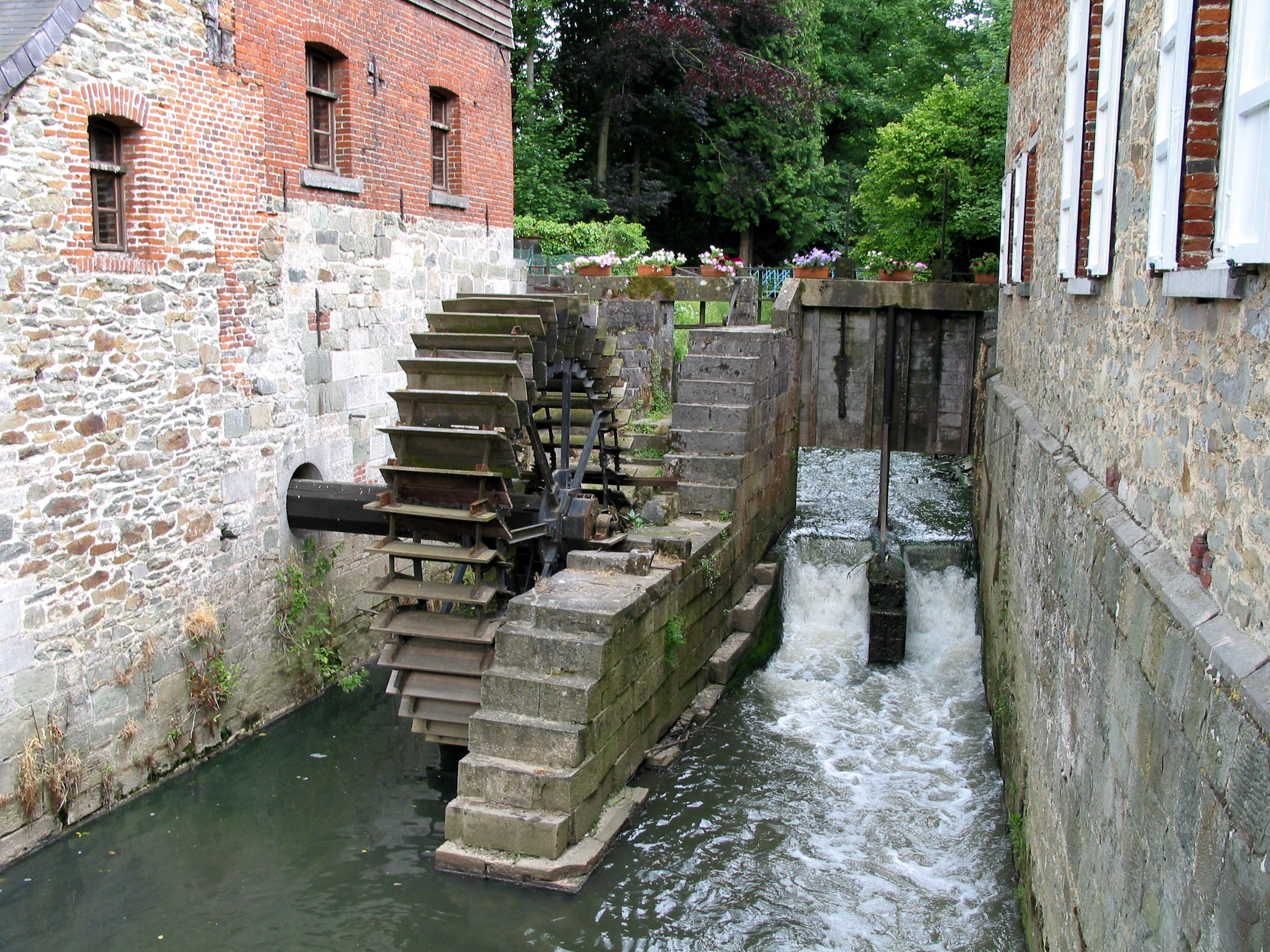
Watermill of Braine-le-Château, Belgium (12th century)

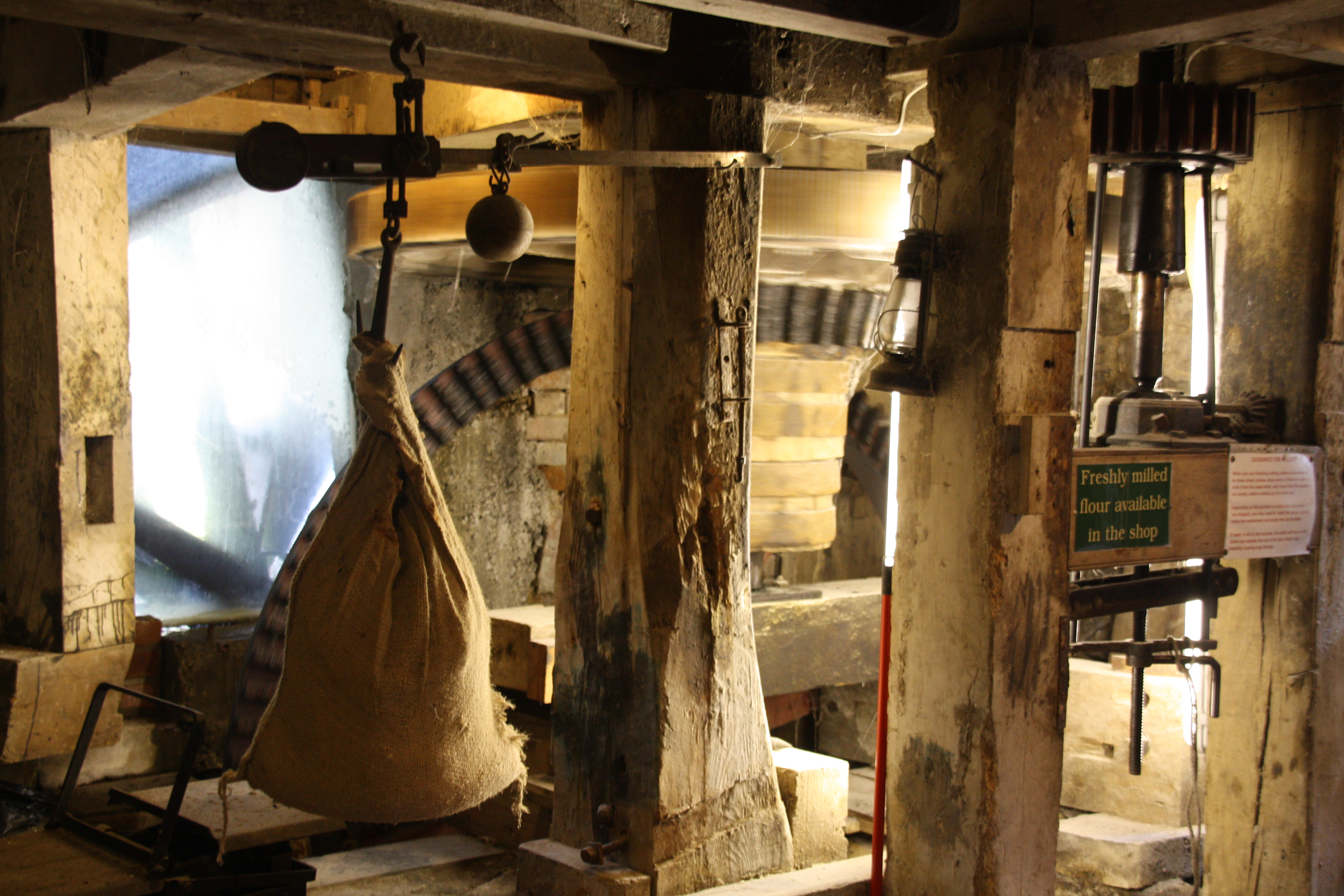
Interior of the Lyme Regis watermill, UK (14th century)

A watermill or water mill is a mill that uses hydropower. It is a structure that uses a water wheel or water turbine to drive a mechanical process such as milling (grinding), rolling, or hammering. Such processes are needed in the production of many material goods, including flour, lumber, paper, textiles, and many metal products. These watermills may comprise gristmills, sawmills, paper mills, textile mills, hammermills, trip hammering mills, rolling mills, and wire drawing mills.

One major way to classify watermills is by wheel orientation (vertical or horizontal), one powered by a vertical waterwheel through a gear mechanism, and the other equipped with a horizontal waterwheel without such a mechanism. The former type can be further subdivided, depending on where the water hits the wheel paddles, into undershot, overshot, breastshot and pitchback (backshot or reverse shot) waterwheel mills. Another way to classify water mills is by an essential trait about their location: tide mills use the movement of the tide; ship mills are water mills onboard (and constituting) a ship.

Watermills impact the river dynamics of the watercourses where they are installed. During the time watermills operate channels tend to sedimentate, particularly backwater. Also in the backwater area, inundation events and sedimentation of adjacent floodplains increase. Over time however these effects are cancelled by river banks becoming higher. Where mills have been removed, river incision increases and channels deepen.

==== Rail transport ====
A water balance railway is a funicular, aerial tramway, or cable railway that uses the weight of water to move its carriages.

==== Compressed air ====
A plentiful head of water can be made to generate compressed air directly without moving parts. In these designs, a falling column of water is deliberately mixed with air bubbles generated through turbulence or a venturi pressure reducer at the high-level intake. This allows it to fall down a shaft into a subterranean, high-roofed chamber where the now-compressed air separates from the water and becomes trapped. The height of the falling water column maintains compression of the air in the top of the chamber, while an outlet, submerged below the water level in the chamber allows water to flow back to the surface at a lower level than the intake. A separate outlet in the roof of the chamber supplies the compressed air. A facility on this principle was built on the Montreal River at Ragged Shutes near Cobalt, Ontario, in 1910 and supplied 5,000 horsepower to nearby mines.

=== Electricity ===
Hydroelectricity is the biggest hydropower application. Hydroelectricity generates about 15% of global electricity and provides at least 50% of the total electricity supply for more than 35 countries. In 2021, global installed hydropower electrical capacity reached almost 1400 GW, the highest among all renewable energy technologies.

Hydroelectricity generation starts with converting either the potential energy of water that is present due to the site's elevation or the kinetic energy of moving water into electrical energy.

Hydroelectric power plants vary in terms of the way they harvest energy. One type involves a dam and a reservoir. The water in the reservoir is available on demand to be used to generate electricity by passing through channels that connect the dam to the reservoir. The water spins a turbine, which is connected to the generator that produces electricity.

The other type is called a run-of-river plant. In this case, a barrage is built to control the flow of water, absent a reservoir. The run-of river power plant needs continuous water flow and therefore has less ability to provide power on demand. The kinetic energy of flowing water is the main source of energy.

Both designs have limitations. For example, dam construction can result in discomfort to nearby residents. The dam and reservoirs occupy a relatively large amount of space that may be opposed by nearby communities. Moreover, reservoirs can potentially have major environmental consequences such as harming downstream habitats. On the other hand, the limitation of the run-of-river project is the decreased efficiency of electricity generation because the process depends on the speed of the seasonal river flow. This means that the rainy season increases electricity generation compared to the dry season.

The size of hydroelectric plants can vary from small plants called micro hydro, to large plants that supply power to a whole country. As of 2019, the five largest power stations in the world are conventional hydroelectric power stations with dams.

Hydroelectricity can also be used to store energy in the form of potential energy between two reservoirs at different heights with pumped-storage. Water is pumped uphill into reservoirs during periods of low demand to be released for generation when demand is high or system generation is low.

Other forms of electricity generation with hydropower include tidal stream generators using energy from tidal power generated from oceans, rivers, and human-made canal systems to generating electricity.

Hydropower generation

Share electricity hydro

Per capita hydro

Annual change hydro

A conventional dammed-hydro facility (hydroelectric dam) is the most common type of hydroelectric power generation.

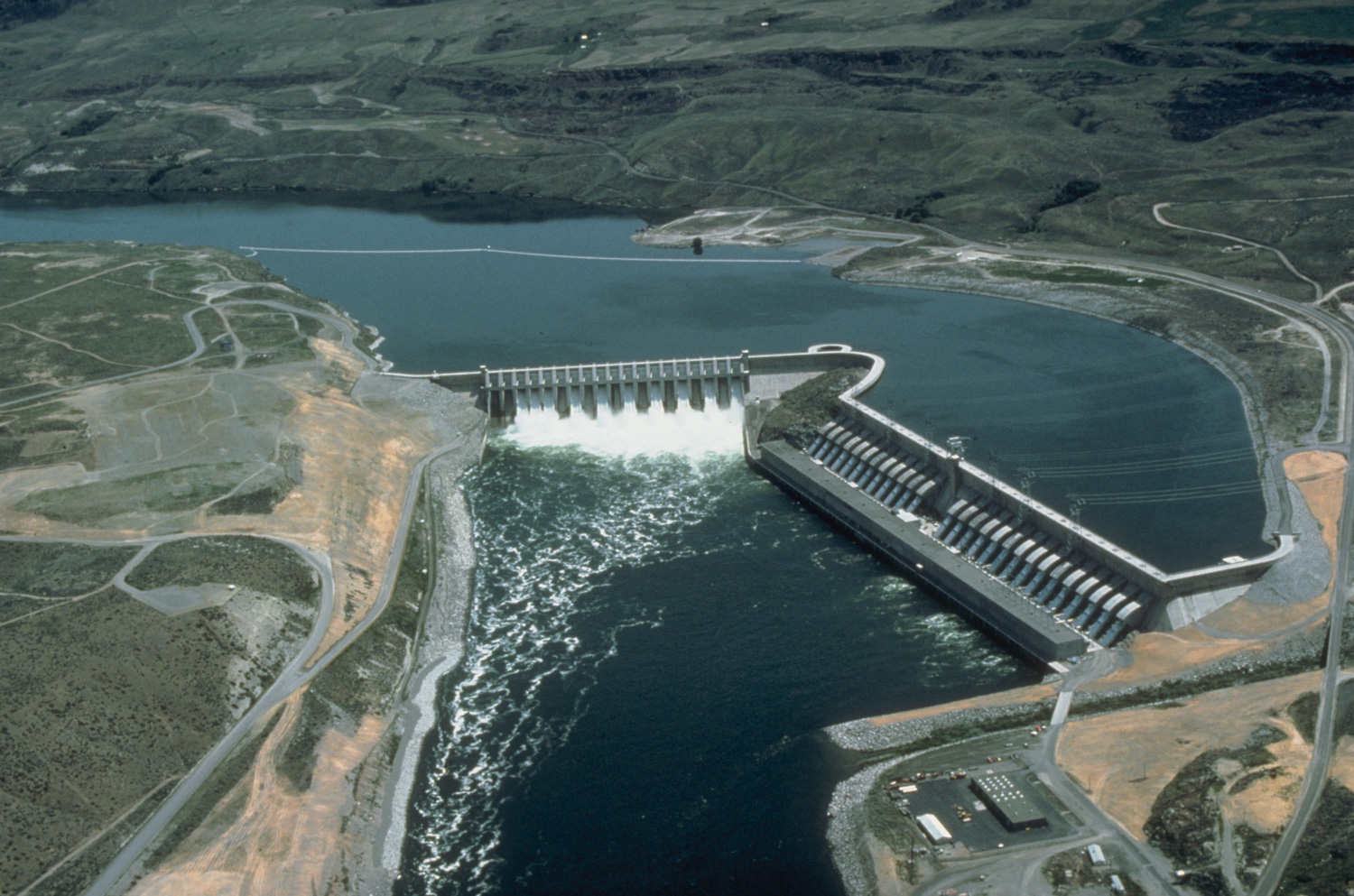
Chief Joseph Dam near Bridgeport, Washington, is a major run-of-the-river station without a sizeable reservoir.

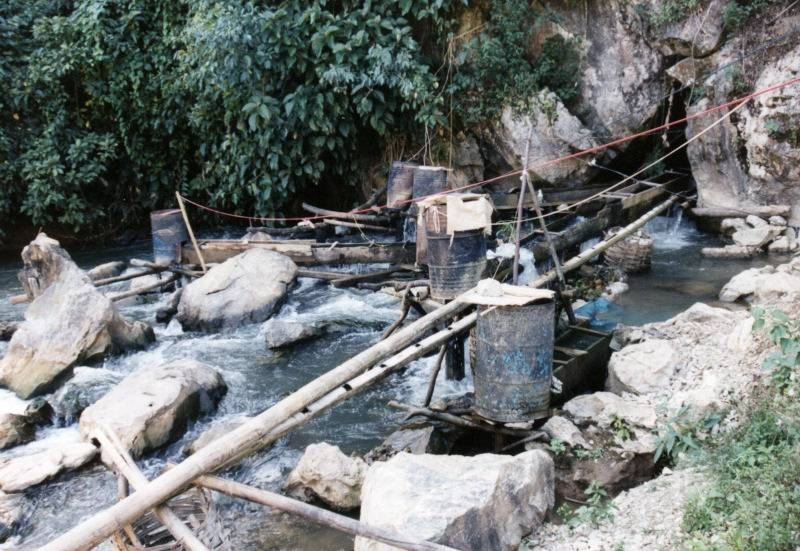
Micro hydro in Northwest Vietnam

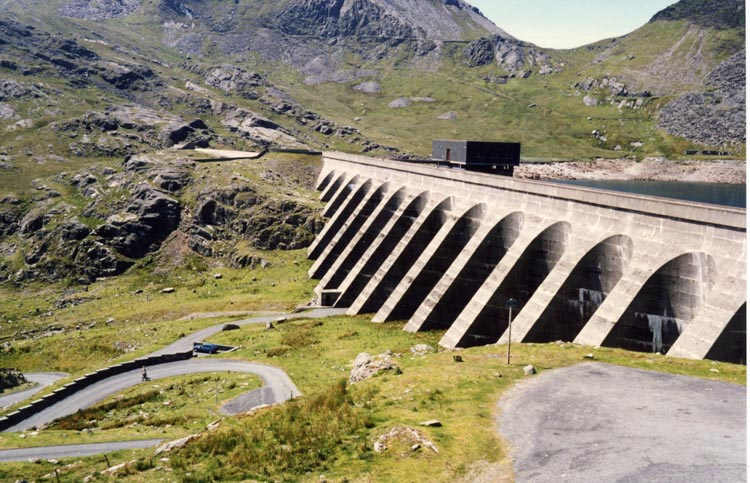
The upper reservoir and dam of the Ffestiniog Pumped Storage Scheme in Wales. The lower power station can generate 360 MW of electricity.

== Rain power ==
Billions of litres of rainwater can fall, which can generate huge amounts of electrical energy if used in the right way. Research is being done into the different methods of generating power from rain, such as by using the energy in the impact of raindrops. This is in its very early stages, with new and emerging technologies being tested, prototyped and created. Such power has been called rain power. One way in which this has been tried is by using hybrid solar panels called "all-weather solar panels" that can generate electricity from both the sun and the rain.

According to zoologist and science and technology educator, Luis Villazon, a 2008 French study estimated that you could use piezoelectric devices, which generate power when they move, to extract 12 milliwatts from a raindrop. Over a year, this would amount to less than 1 Wh per square metre – enough to power a remote sensor. Villazon suggested a better application would be to collect the water from fallen rain and use it to drive a turbine, with an estimated energy generation of 3 kWh of energy per year for a 185 m^{2} roof. A microturbine-based system created by three students from the Technological University of Mexico has been used to generate electricity. The Pluvia system "uses the stream of rainwater runoff from houses' rooftop rain gutters to spin a microturbine in a cylindrical housing. Electricity generated by that turbine is used to charge 12-volt batteries."

The term rain power has also been applied to hydropower systems which include the process of capturing the rain.

== History ==
=== Ancient history ===
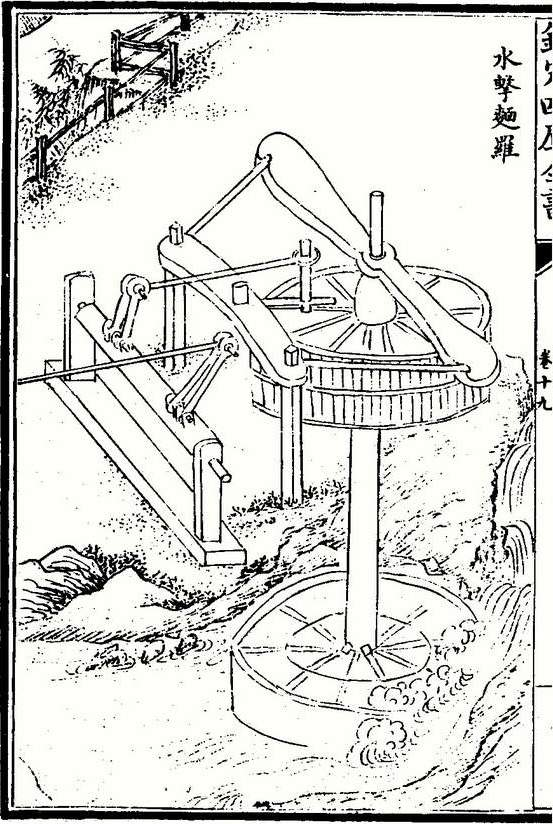
A water piston from the Nongshu by Wang Zhen (fl. 1290–1333)

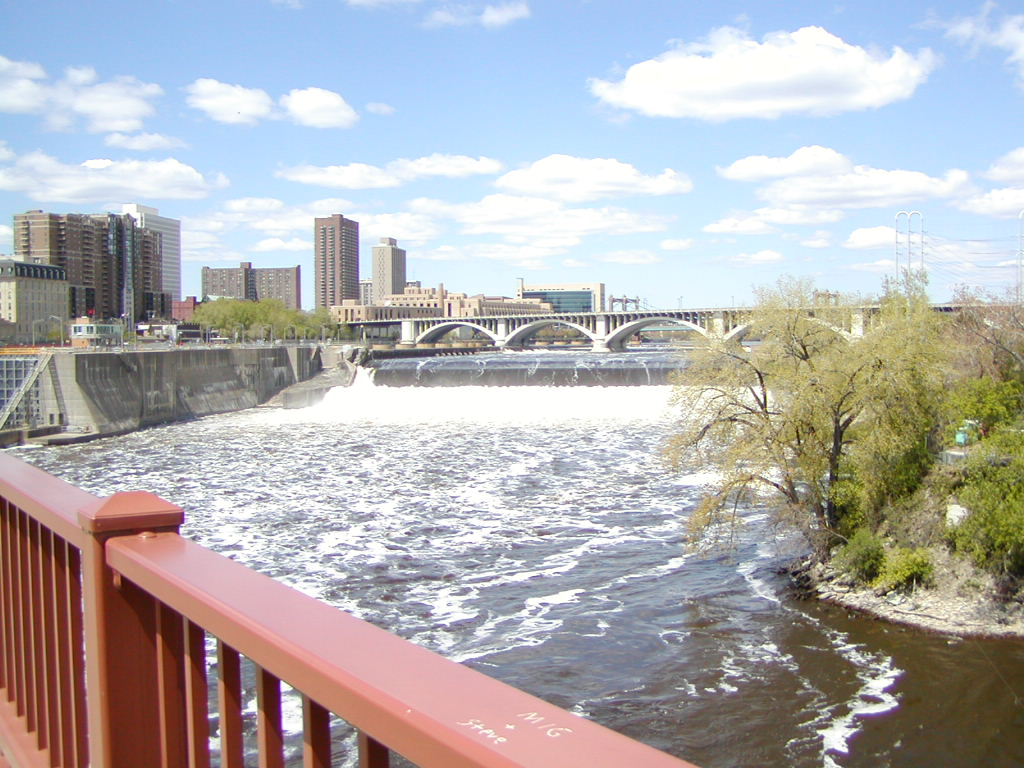
Saint Anthony Falls, United States; hydropower was used here to mill flour.

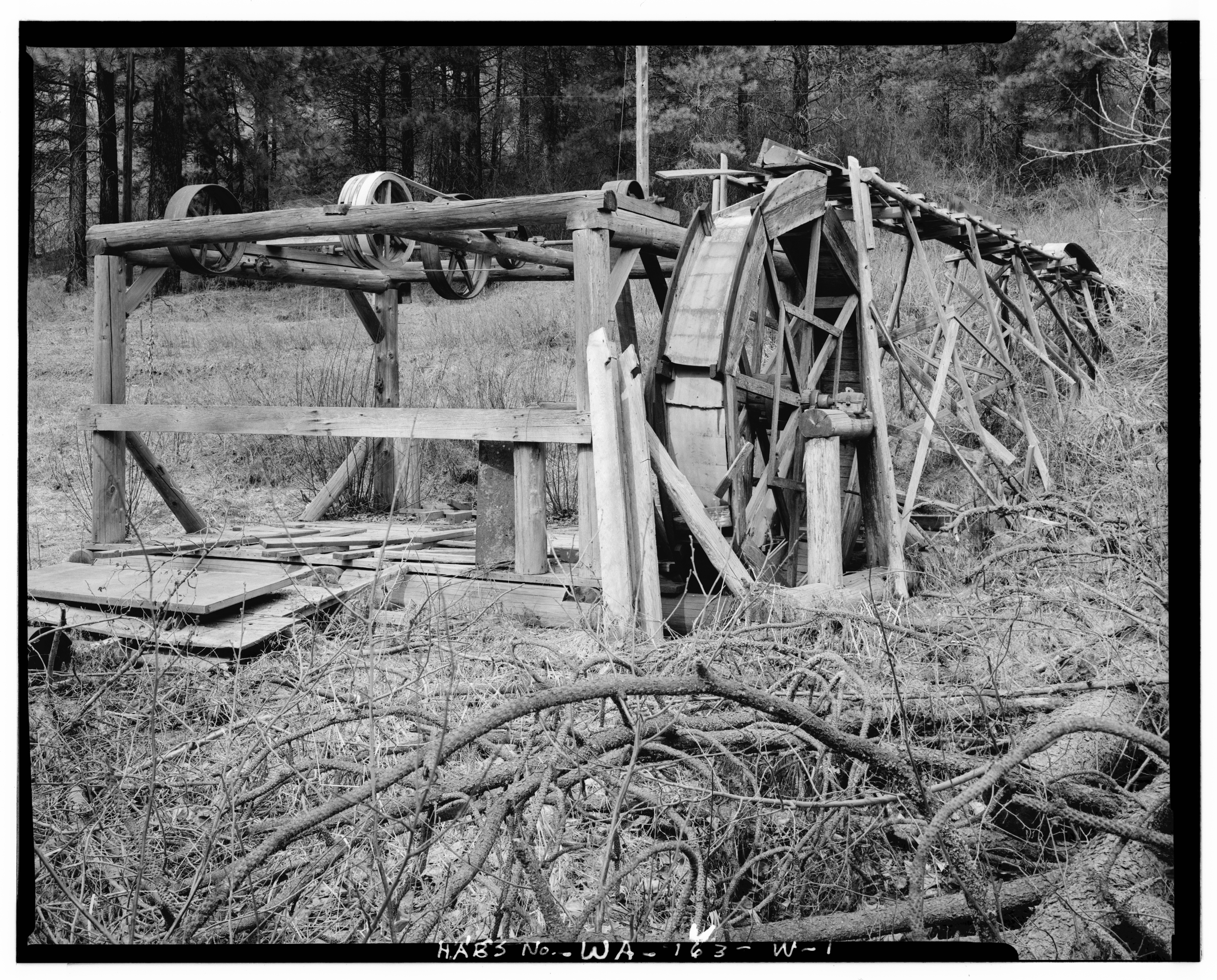
Directly water-powered ore mill, late nineteenth century

Evidence suggests that the fundamentals of hydropower date to ancient Greek civilization. Other evidence indicates that the waterwheel independently emerged in China around the same period. Evidence of water wheels and watermills date to the ancient Near East in the 4th century BC. Moreover, evidence indicates the use of hydropower using irrigation machines to ancient civilizations such as Sumer and Babylonia. Studies suggest that the water wheel was the initial form of water power.

In the Roman Empire, water-powered mills were described by Vitruvius by the first century BC. The Barbegal mill, located in modern-day France, had 16 water wheels processing up to 28 tons of grain per day. Roman waterwheels were also used for sawing marble such as the Hierapolis sawmill of the late 3rd century AD. Such sawmills had a waterwheel that drove two crank-and-connecting rods to power two saws. It also appears in two 6th century Eastern Roman sawmills excavated at Ephesus and Gerasa respectively. The crank and connecting rod mechanism of these Roman watermills converted the rotary motion of the waterwheel into the linear movement of the saw blades.

Water-powered trip hammers and bellows in China, during the Han dynasty (202 BC – 220 AD), were initially thought to be powered by water scoops. However, some historians suggested that they were powered by waterwheels. This is since it was theorized that water scoops would not have had the motive force to operate their blast furnace bellows. Many texts describe the Hun waterwheel; some of the earliest ones are the Jijiupian dictionary of 40 BC, Yang Xiong's text known as the Fangyan of 15 BC, as well as Xin Lun, written by Huan Tan about 20 AD. It was also during this time that the engineer Du Shi (c. AD 31) applied the power of waterwheels to piston-bellows in forging cast iron.

Ancient Indian texts dating back to the 4th century BC refer to the term cakkavattaka (turning wheel), which commentaries explain as arahatta-ghati-yanta (machine with wheel-pots attached), however whether this is water or hand powered is disputed by scholars On this basis, Joseph Needham suggested that the machine was a noria. Terry S. Reynolds, however, argues that the "term used in Indian texts is ambiguous and does not clearly indicate a water-powered device." Thorkild Schiøler argued that it is "more likely that these passages refer to some type of tread- or hand-operated water-lifting device, instead of a water-powered water-lifting wheel."

India received Roman water mills and baths in the early 4th century AD according to Greek sources. Dams, spillways, reservoirs, channels, and water balance would develop in India during the Mauryan, Gupta and Chola empires.

Another example of the early use of hydropower is seen in hushing, a historic method of mining that uses flood or torrent of water to reveal mineral veins. The method was first used at the Dolaucothi Gold Mines in Wales from 75 AD onwards. This method was further developed in Spain in mines such as Las Médulas. Hushing was also widely used in Britain in the Medieval and later periods to extract lead and tin ores. It later evolved into hydraulic mining when used during the California Gold Rush in the 19th century.

The Islamic Empire spanned a large region, mainly in Asia and Africa, along with other surrounding areas. During the Islamic Golden Age and the Arab Agricultural Revolution (8th–13th centuries), hydropower was widely used and developed. Early uses of tidal power emerged along with large hydraulic factory complexes. A wide range of water-powered industrial mills were used in the region including fulling mills, gristmills, paper mills, hullers, sawmills, ship mills, stamp mills, steel mills, sugar mills, and tide mills. By the 11th century, every province throughout the Islamic Empire had these industrial mills in operation, from Al-Andalus and North Africa to West Asia and Central Asia. Muslim engineers also used water turbines while employing gears in watermills and water-raising machines. They also pioneered the use of dams as a source of water power, used to provide additional power to watermills and water-raising machines. Islamic irrigation techniques including Persian Wheels would be introduced to India, and would be combined with local methods, during the Delhi Sultanate and the Mughal Empire.

Furthermore, in his book, The Book of Knowledge of Ingenious Mechanical Devices, the Muslim mechanical engineer, Al-Jazari (1136–1206) described designs for 50 devices. Many of these devices were water-powered, including clocks, a device to serve wine, and five devices to lift water from rivers or pools, where three of them are animal-powered and one can be powered by animal or water. Moreover, they included an endless belt with jugs attached, a cow-powered shadoof (a crane-like irrigation tool), and a reciprocating device with hinged valves.

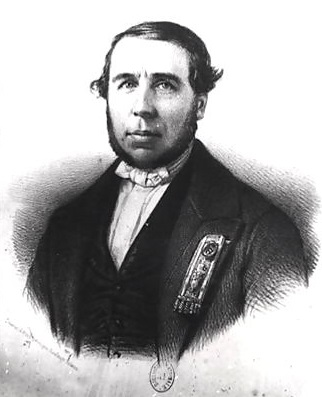
Benoît Fourneyron, the French engineer who developed the first hydropower turbine

=== 19th century ===
In the 19th century, French engineer Benoît Fourneyron developed the first hydropower turbine. This device was implemented in the commercial plant of Niagara Falls in 1895 and it is still operating. In the early 20th century, English engineer William Armstrong built and operated the first private electrical power station which was located in his house in Cragside in Northumberland, England. In 1753, the French engineer Bernard Forest de Bélidor published his book, Architecture Hydraulique, which described vertical-axis and horizontal-axis hydraulic machines.

The growing demand for the Industrial Revolution would drive development as well. At the beginning of the Industrial Revolution in Britain, water was the main power source for new inventions such as Richard Arkwright's water frame. Although water power gave way to steam power in many of the larger mills and factories, it was still used during the 18th and 19th centuries for many smaller operations, such as driving the bellows in small blast furnaces (e.g. the Dyfi Furnace) and gristmills, such as those built at Saint Anthony Falls, which uses the 50-foot (15 m) drop in the Mississippi River.

Technological advances moved the open water wheel into an enclosed turbine or water motor. In 1848, the British-American engineer James B. Francis, head engineer of Lowell's Locks and Canals company, improved on these designs to create a turbine with 90% efficiency. He applied scientific principles and testing methods to the problem of turbine design. His mathematical and graphical calculation methods allowed the confident design of high-efficiency turbines to exactly match a site's specific flow conditions. The Francis reaction turbine is still in use. In the 1870s, deriving from uses in the California mining industry, Lester Allan Pelton developed the high-efficiency Pelton wheel impulse turbine, which used hydropower from the high head streams characteristic of the Sierra Nevada.

=== 20th century ===
The modern history of hydropower begins in the 1900s, with large dams built not simply to power neighboring mills or factories but provide extensive electricity for increasingly distant groups of people. Competition drove much of the global hydroelectric craze: Europe competed amongst itself to electrify first, and the United States' hydroelectric plants in Niagara Falls and the Sierra Nevada inspired bigger and bolder creations across the globe. American and USSR financers and hydropower experts also spread the gospel of dams and hydroelectricity across the globe during the Cold War, contributing to projects such as the Three Gorges Dam and the Aswan High Dam. Feeding desire for large scale electrification with water inherently required large dams across powerful rivers, which impacted public and private interests downstream and in flood zones. Inevitably smaller communities and marginalized groups suffered. They were unable to successfully resist companies flooding them out of their homes or blocking traditional salmon passages. The stagnant water created by hydroelectric dams provides breeding ground for pests and pathogens, leading to local epidemics. However, in some cases, a mutual need for hydropower could lead to cooperation between otherwise adversarial nations.

Hydropower technology and attitude began to shift in the second half of the 20th century. While countries had largely abandoned their small hydropower systems by the 1930s, the smaller hydropower plants began to make a comeback in the 1970s, boosted by government subsidies and a push for more independent energy producers. Some politicians who once advocated for large hydropower projects in the first half of the 20th century began to speak out against them, and citizen groups organizing against dam projects increased.

In the 1980s and 90s the international anti-dam movement had made finding government or private investors for new large hydropower projects incredibly difficult, and given rise to NGOs devoted to fighting dams. Additionally, while the cost of other energy sources fell, the cost of building new hydroelectric dams increased 4% annually between 1965 and 1990, due both to the increasing costs of construction and to the decrease in high quality building sites. In the 1990s, only 18% of the world's electricity came from hydropower. Tidal power production also emerged in the 1960s as a burgeoning alternative hydropower system, though still has not taken hold as a strong energy contender.

==== United States ====
Especially at the start of the American hydropower experiment, engineers and politicians began major hydroelectricity projects to solve a problem of 'wasted potential' rather than to power a population that needed the electricity. When the Niagara Falls Power Company began looking into damming Niagara, the first major hydroelectric project in the United States, in the 1890s they struggled to transport electricity from the falls far enough away to actually reach enough people and justify installation. The project succeeded in large part due to Nikola Tesla's invention of the alternating current motor. On the other side of the country, San Francisco engineers, the Sierra Club, and the federal government fought over acceptable use of the Hetch Hetchy Valley. Despite ostensible protection within a national park, city engineers successfully won the rights to both water and power in the Hetch Hetchy Valley in 1913. After their victory they delivered Hetch Hetchy hydropower and water to San Francisco a decade later and at twice the promised cost, selling power to PG&E which resold to San Francisco residents at a profit.

The American West, with its mountain rivers and lack of coal, turned to hydropower early and often, especially along the Columbia River and its tributaries. The Bureau of Reclamation built the Hoover Dam in 1931, symbolically linking the job creation and economic growth priorities of the New Deal. The federal government quickly followed Hoover with the Shasta Dam and Grand Coulee Dam. Power demand in Oregon did not justify damming the Columbia until WWI revealed the weaknesses of a coal-based energy economy. The federal government then began prioritizing interconnected power—and lots of it. Electricity from all three dams poured into war production during WWII.

After the war, the Grand Coulee Dam and accompanying hydroelectric projects electrified almost all of the rural Columbia Basin, but failed to improve the lives of those living and farming there the way its boosters had promised and also damaged the river ecosystem and migrating salmon populations. In the 1940s as well, the federal government took advantage of the sheer amount of unused power and flowing water from the Grand Coulee to build a nuclear site placed on the banks of the Columbia. The nuclear site leaked radioactive matter into the river, contaminating the entire area.

Post-WWII Americans, especially engineers from the Tennessee Valley Authority, refocused from simply building domestic dams to promoting hydropower abroad. While domestic dam building continued well into the 1970s, with the Reclamation Bureau and Army Corps of Engineers building more than 150 new dams across the American West, organized opposition to hydroelectric dams sparked up in the 1950s and 60s based on environmental concerns. Environmental movements successfully shut down proposed hydropower dams in Dinosaur National Monument and the Grand Canyon, and gained more hydropower-fighting tools with 1970s environmental legislation. As nuclear and fossil fuels grew in the 70s and 80s and environmental activists push for river restoration, hydropower gradually faded in American importance.

==== Africa ====
Foreign powers and IGOs have frequently used hydropower projects in Africa as a tool to interfere in the economic development of African countries, such as the World Bank with the Kariba and Akosombo Dams, and the Soviet Union with the Aswan Dam. The Nile River especially has borne the consequences of countries both along the Nile and distant foreign actors using the river to expand their economic power or national force. After the British occupation of Egypt in 1882, the British worked with Egypt to construct the first Aswan Dam, which they heightened in 1912 and 1934 to try to hold back the Nile floods. Egyptian engineer Adriano Daninos developed a plan for the Aswan High Dam, inspired by the Tennessee Valley Authority's multipurpose dam.

When Gamal Abdel Nasser took power in the 1950s, his government decided to undertake the High Dam project, publicizing it as an economic development project. After American refusal to help fund the dam, and anti-British sentiment in Egypt and British interests in neighboring Sudan combined to make the United Kingdom pull out as well, the Soviet Union funded the Aswan High Dam. Between 1977 and 1990 the dam's turbines generated one third of Egypt's electricity. The building of the Aswan Dam triggered a dispute between Sudan and Egypt over the sharing of the Nile, especially since the dam flooded part of Sudan and decreased the volume of water available to them. Ethiopia, also located on the Nile, took advantage of the Cold War tensions to request assistance from the United States for their own irrigation and hydropower investments in the 1960s. While progress stalled due to the coup d'état of 1974 and following 17-year-long Ethiopian Civil War Ethiopia began construction on the Grand Ethiopian Renaissance Dam in 2011.

Beyond the Nile, hydroelectric projects cover the rivers and lakes of Africa. The Inga powerplant on the Congo River had been discussed since Belgian colonization in the late 19th century, and was successfully built after independence. Mobutu's government failed to regularly maintain the plants and their capacity declined until the 1995 formation of the Southern African Power Pool created a multi-national power grid and plant maintenance program. States with an abundance of hydropower, such as the Democratic Republic of the Congo and Ghana, frequently sell excess power to neighboring countries. Foreign actors such as Chinese hydropower companies have proposed a significant amount of new hydropower projects in Africa, and already funded and consulted on many others in countries like Mozambique and Ghana.

Small hydropower also played an important role in early 20th century electrification across Africa. In South Africa, small turbines powered gold mines and the first electric railway in the 1890s, and Zimbabwean farmers installed small hydropower stations in the 1930s. While interest faded as national grids improved in the second half of the century, 21st century national governments in countries including South Africa and Mozambique, as well as NGOs serving countries like Zimbabwe, have begun re-exploring small-scale hydropower to diversify power sources and improve rural electrification.

==== Europe ====
In the early 20th century, two major factors motivated the expansion of hydropower in Europe: in the northern countries of Norway and Sweden, high rainfall and mountains proved exceptional resources for abundant hydropower, and in the south, coal shortages pushed governments and utility companies to seek alternative power sources.

Early on, Switzerland dammed the Alpine rivers and the Swiss Rhine, creating, along with Italy and Scandinavia, a Southern Europe hydropower race. In Italy's Po Valley, the main 20th-century transition was not the creation of hydropower but the transition from mechanical to electrical hydropower. 12,000 watermills churned in the Po watershed in the 1890s, but the first commercial hydroelectric plant, completed in 1898, signaled the end of the mechanical reign. These new large plants moved power away from rural mountainous areas to urban centers in the lower plain. Italy prioritized early near-nationwide electrification, almost entirely from hydropower, which powered its rise as a dominant European and imperial force. However, they failed to reach any conclusive standard for determining water rights before WWI.

Modern German hydropower dam construction was built on a history of small dams powering mines and mills in the 15th century. Some parts of the German industry relied more on waterwheels than steam until the 1870s. The German government did not set out building large dams such as the prewar Urft, Mohne, and Eder dams to expand hydropower: they mostly wanted to reduce flooding and improve irrigation. However, hydropower quickly emerged as a bonus for all these dams, especially in the coal-poor south. Bavaria even achieved a statewide power grid by damming the Walchensee in 1924, inspired in part by loss of coal reserves after WWI.

Hydropower became a symbol of regional pride and distaste for northern 'coal barons', although the north also held strong enthusiasm for hydropower. Dam building rapidly increased after WWII, aiming to increase hydropower. However, conflict accompanied the dam building and spread of hydropower: agrarian interests suffered from decreased irrigation, small mills lost water flow, and different interest groups fought over where dams should be located, controlling who benefited and whose homes they drowned.

== See also ==
- Deep water source cooling
- Energy conversion efficiency
- Gravitation water vortex power plant
- Hydraulic ram
- Hydropower Sustainability Assessment Protocol
- International Hydropower Association
- Low-head hydro power
- Marine current power
- Marine energy
- Ocean thermal energy conversion
- Osmotic power
- Pumped-storage hydroelectricity
- Run-of-the-river hydroelectricity
- Tidal power
- Tidal stream generator
- Wave power

== Sources ==
- Berton, Pierre (2010). Niagara: A History of the Falls. SUNY Press. ISBN 978-1-4384-2930-4.
- Blackbourn, D (2006). The conquest of nature: water, landscape, and the making of modern Germany. Norton. ISBN 978-0-393-06212-0.
- Breeze, Paul (2018). Hydropower. doi:10.1016/C2016-0-03622-7. ISBN 978-0-12-812906-7.
- Breeze, Paul (2019). Power Generation Technologies. doi:10.1016/C2017-0-03267-6. ISBN 978-0-08-102631-1.
- McNeill, J. R. (2001). Something New Under the Sun: An Environmental History Of The Twentieth Century World. W. W. Norton & Company. ISBN 978-0-393-32183-8.
- Reynolds, Terry S. (1983). Stronger than a Hundred Men: A History of the Vertical Water Wheel. Baltimore: Johns Hopkins University Press. ISBN 0-8018-7248-0.
- Wikander, Örjan (2000), "The Water-Mill", in Wikander, Örjan (ed.), Handbook of Ancient Water Technology, Technology and Change in History, vol. 2, Leiden: Brill, pp. 371–400, ISBN 90-04-11123-9
- White, Richard (1995). The Organic Machine. Hill and Wang. ISBN 978-0-8090-3559-5.
