= International Geothermal Association =

Nonprofit organization

- Founded: 6 July 1988 in Auckland
- Type: Non-profit NGO
- Location: Bonn, Germany
- Members: around 10,000
- Official language: English
- President: Bjarni Palsson
- Key people: Marit Brommer (Chief Executive Officer), Helen Robinson (Regional Manager, Africa), Abigaelle Peterschmitt (Marketing and Communications Manager), Gregor Rumberg (Events Manager)

The International Geothermal Association (IGA) is an international non-profit, non-political, non-governmental association representing the geothermal energy sector worldwide. The organisation works for the promotion and worldwide deployment of geothermal energy technologies and advocates for a future energy system based on renewable energy. The IGA has consultative status to the UN and special observer status to the Green Climate Fund.

As of 2024, the IGA has more than 10,000 members in over 88 countries.

== History ==
The International Geothermal Association was founded on 6 July 1988 in Auckland, New Zealand, as a non-profit organization to encourage research, development and utilization of geothermal resources worldwide. The first idea to create a structured group of organizations and experts involved in development and promotion of geothermal energy dates back to the late sixties. Preliminary discussions about the establishment of an international geothermal association took place during the Symposium on Geothermal Energy, which was held in Pisa, Italy, in September 1970, initiated by UN-DTCD (United Nations Department of Technical Cooperation for Development) and organized by ENEL and CNR. However, the time for this idea has not yet come and it was discussed further, as for example during the World Geothermal Congress in San Francisco in 1975 or during the International Geothermal Workshop in Ecuador in 1978. In 1986 there was a special study dedicated to the institutional aspects of a possible international geothermal association. After consulting experts from different countries, various international institutions and five international geothermal schools operating at that time the study was completed. It has concluded that an international geothermal community is ready to set up a unique and autonomous geothermal organization. The first foundation meeting took place in Castelnuovo V.C., Italy, 2–5 May 1989.

== Mission ==
The IGA's mission is to advocate for and promote the sustainable utilization and development of geothermal resources worldwide. We are committed to shaping a future where geothermal energy is a key contributor to global energy transition and climate change mitigation. Our approach encompasses areas of Training and Capacity Building, Communication and Outreach, Geothermal Standards, Sustainability, Finance and Investment

== Structure ==
The International Geothermal Association consists of its members, its executive team, and its board of directors.

== Membership ==
There are different membership categories:

- Individual members: scientists, technologists and other persons engaged in the research, development or utilization of geothermal energy.
- Corporate members: industrial, scientific or cultural organizations which are established on a commercial or profit-making basis, are interested in geothermal energy and support the objectives of the Association.
- Student members: students with an interest in geothermal energy who are regularly enrolled in a college or university.
- Affiliated members: persons belonging to the Association through a group scheme by virtue of their membership in an Affiliated Organization.
- Institutional members: international, national, regional or local, non-profit organizations entrusted with promotion, planning, supervision, co-ordination or performance of geothermal activities and which support the objectives of the Association.
- Sustaining members: organizations or persons who wish to demonstrate their interest in geothermal energy by making a voluntary contribution to the Association above a minimum level.
- Honorary members: senior Individual Members who have given many years of service to the Association and/or have made significant contribution in the field of geothermal energy.

== See also ==
- List of notable renewable energy organizations
- Andrea Blair, president 2020–2023
