= World Bioenergy Association =

- Founded: 2008 in Stockholm
- Type: Non-profit NGO
- Location: Stockholm, Sweden
- Key people: Christian Rakos, President (2020-); Bharadwaj Kummamuru, Executive Director (2017-)
- Website: www.worldbioenergy.org

The World Bioenergy Association (WBA) is an international NGO and non-profit association that represents the bioenergy sector globally. The organisation works to promote the use of sustainable bioenergy which includes Biomass, Biofuels and Biogas. The WBA's mission statement is to 'promote the use of sustainable bioenergy, globally'.

The secretariat of WBA is in Stockholm in Sweden.

== History ==
The World Bioenergy Association was founded in 2008 in Stockholm, Sweden as a non-profit NGO to support a wide range of actors across the bioenergy industry, including governments, scientists and companies.

== Partners ==
Since 2009 the WBA has been a member of the International Renewable Energy Alliance (REN Alliance) which is made up of 5 international organisations representing the Wind, Solar, Geothermal, Hydro and Bioenergy industries. The WBA is also represented on the steering committee of REN21.

== Presidents ==
- 2008-2012: Kent Nyström (1948-2012), Sweden
- 2012-2016: Dr. Heinz Kopetz, Austria
- 2016-2020: Remigijus Lapinskas (b. 1968), Lithuania
- Since 2020: Christian Rakos (b. 1959), Austria

== See also ==
- International Renewable Energy Alliance
- REN21
- List of notable renewable energy organizations
- European Biomass Association
