= Green Power Forum =

English renewable energy group

The Green Power Forum was a United Kingdom industry group established by companies in the renewable energy sector to promote energy efficiency and the adoption of renewable technologies among organizations and businesses. It organized conferences focused on the financial benefits of renewable technologies, government legislation, products and technologies. The first conference was held in Liverpool in October 2009. Activity is documented through at least 2013. No reliable sources indicate continued operation after that period.

== Organisation ==
The Green Power Forum hosts conferences aiming to advise on the financial benefits of renewable technologies, government legislation, products, and technologies. Delegates attend from sectors including construction, facilities managers, energy managers, engineers and architects. The first conference was held in Liverpool in October 2009.

The chairman of GPF is Mark McManus, the managing director of heat pump specialist Stiebel Eltron UK. Other members of the Green Power Board include North West Energy Support Agency, Envirolink Northwest, underfloor heating supplier Nu-Heat, sustainable energy consultants and installers ISO Energy UK and Liverpool Chamber of Commerce.
