= World Commission on Dams =

Organization that measures the impacts and effectiveness of large dam development

The World Commission on Dams (WCD) existed between April 1997 and 2001, to research the environmental, social and economic impacts of the development of large dams globally. The self-styled WCD consisted of members of civil society, academia, the private sector, professional associations and one government representative, to measure the impacts and effectiveness of large dam development, including the effect on dam affected communities and project developers. It is an example of multistakeholder governance. The ultimate outcome of the WCD was to issue a final report which was launched under the patronage of Nelson Mandela in November 2000. The WCD recommended ten guidelines for dam building.
