= International Solar Energy Society =

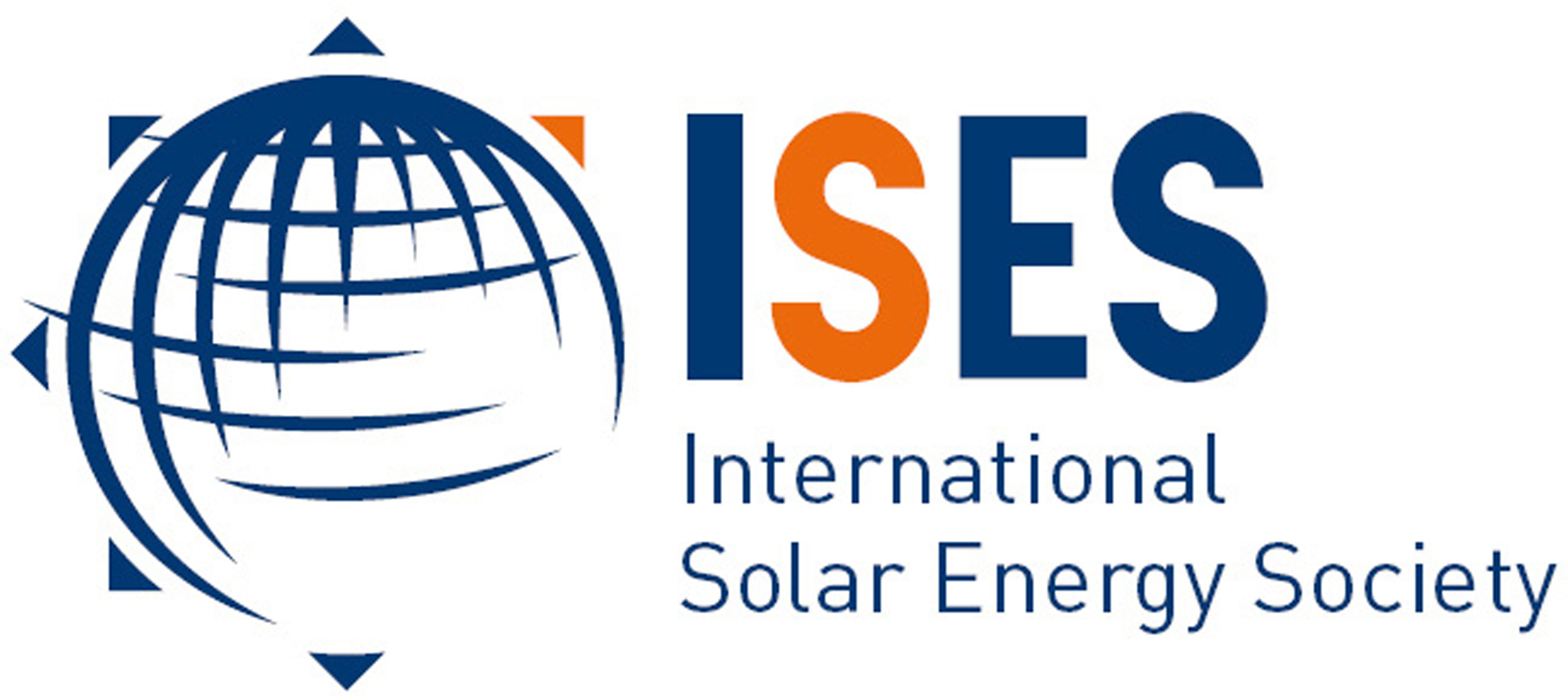
- Formation: 1954
- Type: Nonprofit, NGO
- Headquarters: Freiburg im Breisgau
- Location: Germany
- Coordinates: 47.977318°N 7.826739°E
- Official language: English
- President: Prof. Viktoria Martin (KTH Royal Institute of Technology in Stockholm, Sweden)
- Staff: 5
- Website: ises.org

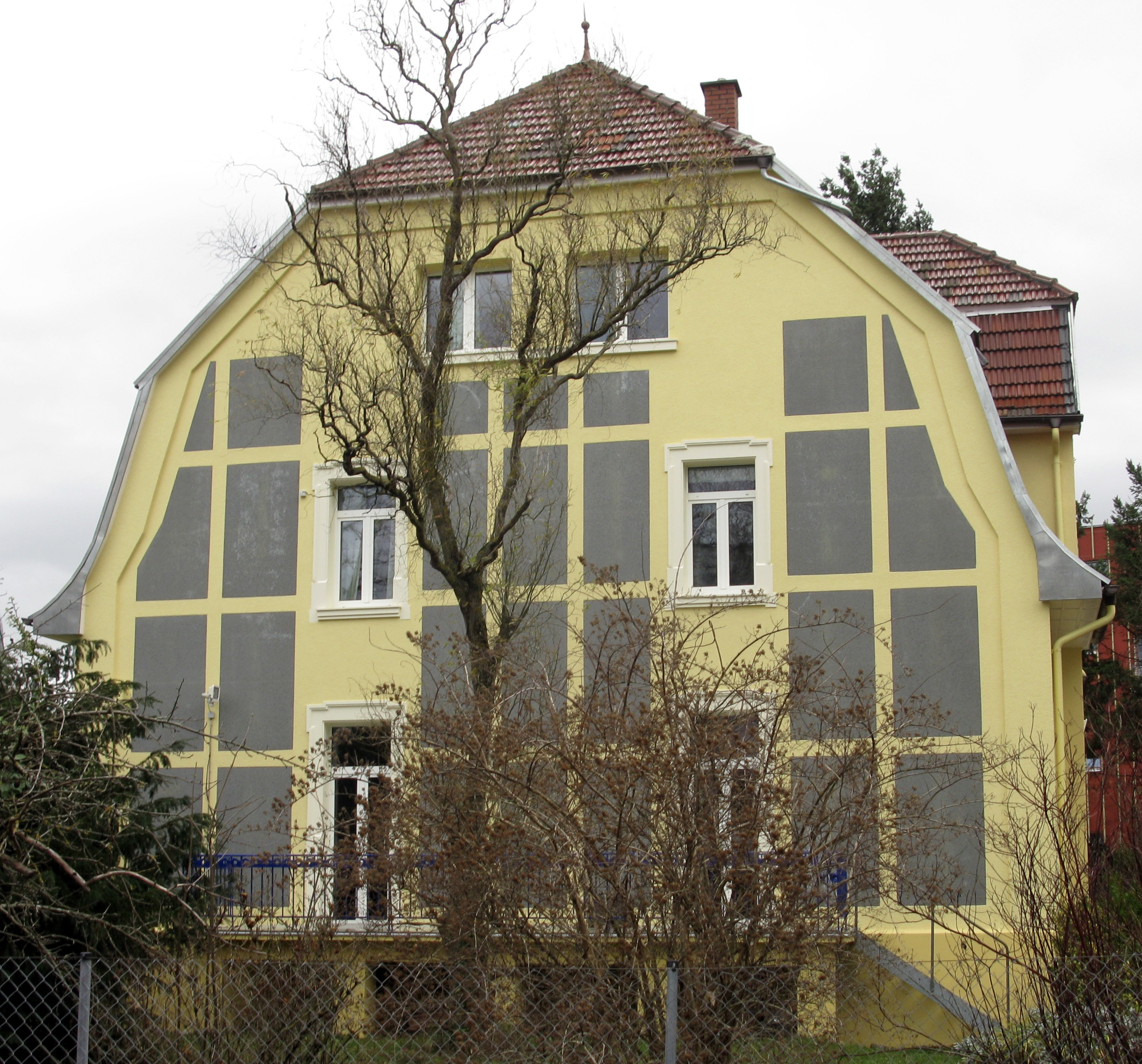
Villa Tannheim in Freiburg-Vauban

The International Solar Energy Society (ISES), founded in 1954, is a UN-accredited membership organization promoting renewable energy. It is the largest international solar association, and there are branches in countries such as UK. They write a monthly column for pv magazine, and judge the Farrington Daniels Award.
