= OE buoy =

Floating wave power device

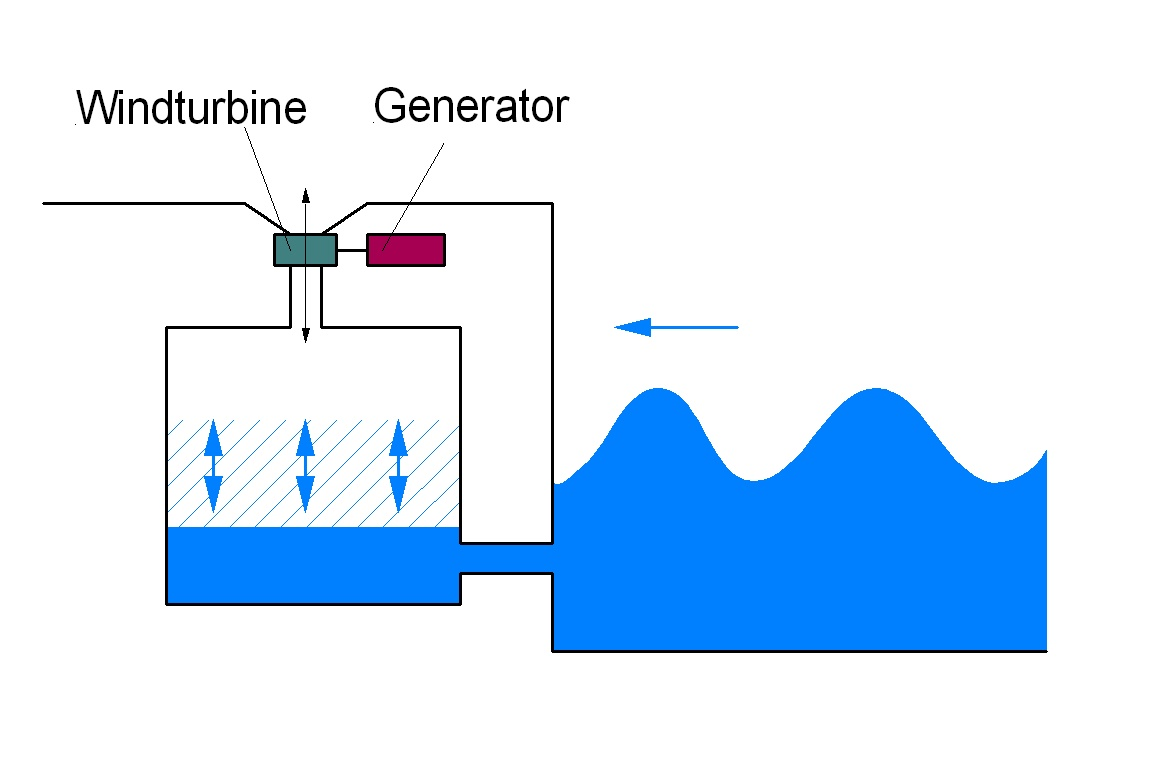
An oscillating water column

The OE Buoy or Ocean Energy Buoy is a floating wave power device that uses an oscillating water column design. It is being developed by Irish company Ocean Energy Ltd., based in Cork, in collaboration with the Hydraulics and Maritime Research Centre at University College Cork, Queen's University Belfast, and Marine Institute Ireland.

The OE buoy has only one moving part, the self-rectifying Wells turbine.

The OE Buoy is a version of a device known as the Backward Bent Duct Buoy (BBDB) which was invented in 1986 by wave energy pioneer and Japanese naval commander Yoshio Masuda.

== History ==
The company Ocean Energy Ltd. was founded in 2002 by Michael Whelan and John McCarthy.

Initial model test to prove the concept were conducted at the Hydraulics and Maritime Research Centre of University College Cork at 1:50 scale, followed by further tank testing in École centrale de Nantes, France at 1:15 scale.

=== Quarter-scale tests, Galway Bay ===
From December 2006, a quarter-scale version of the OE12 was tested at the Ocean Energy Test Site in Galway Bay, near Spiddal. It was moored on site on Christmas day, and survived waves of up to 8.2 metres (27 ft) during a force 11 storm on New Year's Eve. Initially, the device was tested without a turbine to provide a baseline to compare with tank testing, but one was fitted in September 2007. Testing continued for a further 2 years until September 2009. The buoy was 12 m long, 6 m wide, and 6 m high (approx. 39×20×20 ft), and weighed 28 tonnes. As of the 5th of March 2011 the model has been redeployed at the same site, primarily as a data collector for the EU funded Cores Project.

=== Full-scale test, Hawaii ===
Construction of a full-scale version commenced in Oregon in 2018, built by Vigor Industrial. This device is 38 ft long, 59 ft wide, with a draft of 31 ft (38×18×9.4 m), weighs 826 tons, and has a power rating of 500 kW (although this could be increased to 1.25 MW). It was originally scheduled to be deploy to the US Navy's Wave Energy Test Site (WETS) in 2019. The device was finally deployed by Ocean Energy USA at the WETS off the windward coast of Oahu on 19 July 2024. It has a rated power of 1.25 MW, and is expected to be connected to the grid in the coming weeks.

=== WEDUSEA Project ===
As part of the Horizon Europe WEDUSEA project (Wave Energy Demonstration at Utility Scale to Enable Arrays), Ocean Energy and partners plan to adapt the design and test an OE35 device at the European Marine Energy Centre in Orkney, Scotland. The project was given the go-ahead to commence the 1 MW device build in September 2024, with testing then scheduled to start in June 2025. As of March 2026, installation of the device is scheduled for June 2026.

== Future projects ==
Ocean Energy also plan to scale the technology up further, to the OE50 buoy capable of producing 2.5 MW.
