= Mutriku Breakwater Wave Plant =

Wave power station in Mutriku, Spain

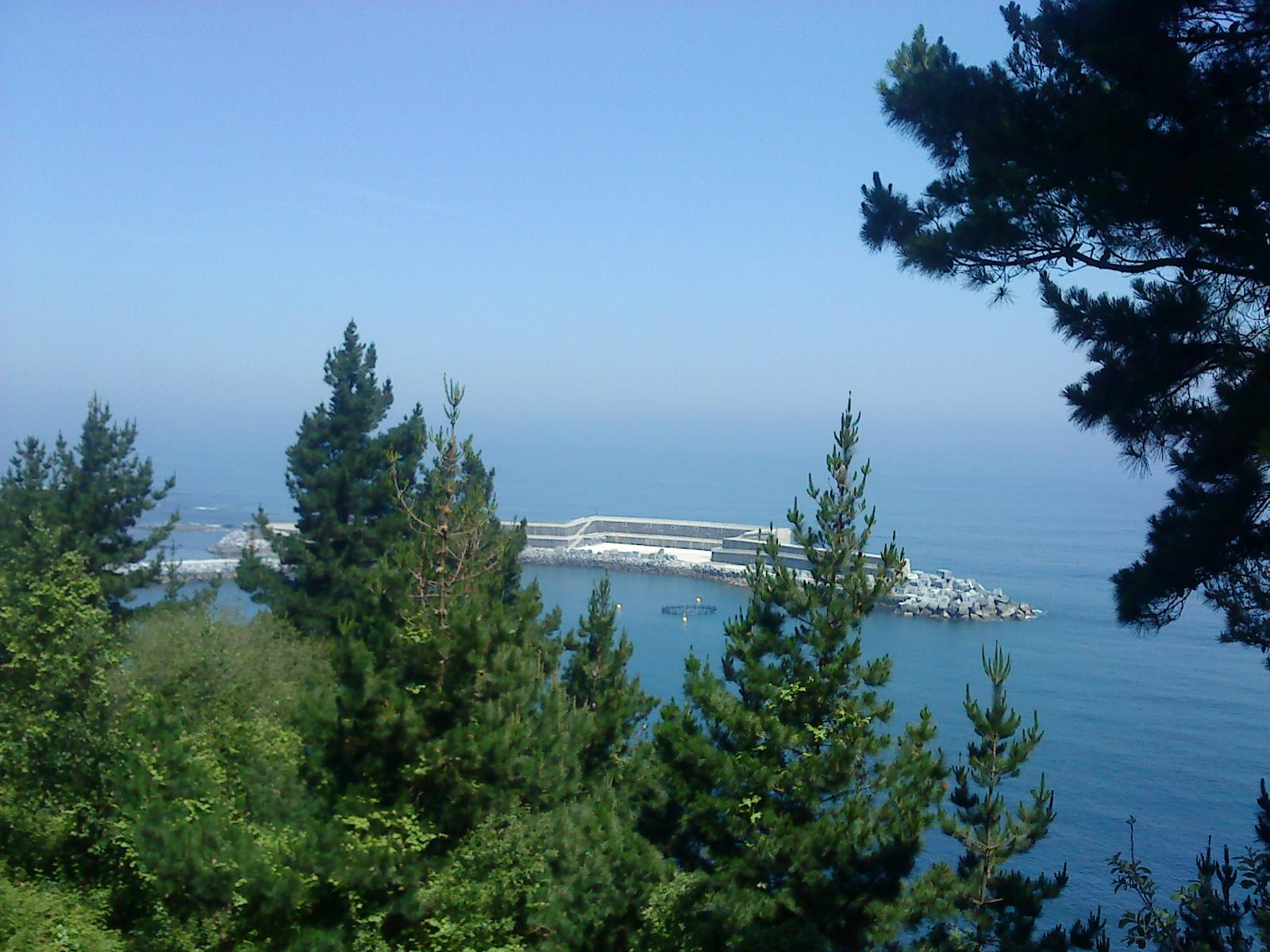
- Country: Spain
- Location: Mutriku
- Coordinates: 43.3120°N 2.3781°W
- Construction began: 2006
- Commission date: July 2011
- Construction cost: €6.4 million
- Operator: Ente Vasco de la Energía

Wave power station
- Type: Oscillating water column

Power generation
- Units operational: 16 × 18.5 KW
- Nameplate capacity: 296 KW

External links
- Commons: Related media on Commons

The Mutriku Breakwater Wave Plant is a wave power plant constructed by Ente Vasco de la Energía (EVE), the Basque energy agency, in the bay of Mutriku in the Bay of Biscay. It is the world's first breakwater wave power plant with a multiple turbine arrangement. The plant has a capacity of 296 kW from 16 turbo generator sets. It was inaugurated on July 8, 2011.

== Design and construction ==
The Mutriku plant was built by Ente Vasco de la Energía, using oscillating water column (OWC) technology from Voith Hydro. After the design for the Mutriku breakwater was completed in 2005, the Basque government's Department of Transport and Public Works asked EVE to design a wave power plant integrated into the breakwater. OWC technology was chosen as it had been previously tested (for example, at the Islay LIMPET device) and could be easily integrated into the existing breakwater design.

Construction of the power plant began in 2006, with completion planned by 2009. The plant was built into a 100-meter section of the breakwater on a 0.50 meter deep foundation, measuring 14.24 meters wide and 102 meters long. 16 air chambers were constructed on the foundation, using prefabricated parts. Each air chamber has a permanently submerged opening to allow ingress of sea water into the air column. A fixed-pitch Wells turbine turbo generator set is connected to each air chamber. Each turbo generator unit is oriented vertically, measures 2.83 meters tall by 1.25 meters wide and weighs approximately 1,200 kilograms (2,600 lb). These have an individual rated capacity of 18.5 kW, with the 16 units providing a total capacity of 296 kW. This equipment was manufactured by Voith Hydro.

== Operational history ==
The Mutriku power plant was inaugurated on July 8, 2011. It produces enough energy to supply approximately 100 households. During its first five years of operation, it supplied over 1.3 GWh of power to the grid. In 2020, EVE announced that the Mutriku plant had produced a cumulative total of 2 GWh, making it the record holder for most electricity produced by a wave power plant, as well as most cumulative operating hours for a wave power plant.

A study published in 2018 calculated that the capacity factor of the Mutriku power plant from 2014 to 2016 was 0.11. The researchers behind this study proposed that capacity factor could be increased by improving control of turbine speeds.

From 2016 onwards, various monitoring efforts were implemented in order to assess the environmental impact of underwater sound emissions produced by the power plant.

EVE announced in October 2022 that the plant delivered a total of 2.7GWh of energy to the grid.

The turbines have an annual pneumatic to electric conversion efficiency of 30%. As of October 2022, the turbines are approaching their end-of-life and there are proposals to replace them with newer, higher efficiency (50%) turbines. As Voith has discontinued the development of the product, a new manufacturer has to be found. The project budget for the turbine replacement is expected to be 3.2 million Euros (vat excl.) and the replacement would take 42 months.

By the end of 2023, the total lifetime generation was over 3 GWh, with 266 MWh in 2023.

== See also ==
- List of wave power stations
