= Sotenäs Wave Power Station =

Wave farm in Sotenäs, Sweden

- Country: Sweden
- Location: Kungshamn, Sotenäs
- Coordinates: 58°22′45″N 11°08′57″E
- Status: Closed 2019
- Construction began: 2010
- Commission date: 14 January 2016
- Operators: Fortum, Seabased

Wave power station
- Type: Point absorber
- Water body: Skagerrak
- Water depth: 50 m (160 ft)

Power generation
- Units decommissioned: 36 × ≈30 kW
- Nameplate capacity: 1 MW

Sotenäs is a wave farm located in Kungshamn, in the municipality of Sotenäs, Sweden. The facility consists of 36 wave energy converters (WECs), with a total installed capacity of nearly 1 MW. Each WEC generates power using point absorber buoys connected to linear generators on the seabed. The generators are located at a depth of 50 m (160 ft). According to Seabased, the technology used in the project could deliver electricity for under 10 cents per kWh. Initial announcements stated that the power plant would eventually expand to around 10 MW capacity, but in 2017 Seabased announced it would no longer expand the plant beyond the 36 WECs already in place. The Sotenäs wave park was not in operation between 2016-2020, with no buoys connected to the gravity-based PTOs. The site remains inactive, and is studied as an example of an artificial reef.

== History ==
- In February 2010, the Swedish Energy Agency awarded an investment grant to Fortum and Seabased for the wave power station.
- 9 December 2011, Fortum and Seabased sign an agreement to jointly construct a wave power station in Sotenäs, Sweden. Seabased agreed to manufacture buoys, generators, substations and converters at a factory to be built in Lysekil. Fortum announced the power station would produce 10 MW by 2015, using 420 buoys.
- 13 December 2015, the test site consisting of four wave energy converters (WEC) was connected to the Nordic grid in Kungshamn, through a low voltage marine substation and a 10 kilometres (6.2 mi) long subsea cable.
- 14 January 2016, the four buoys were connected to the WEC, and thus generating electric power for the first time. An additional 32 WECs were eventually installed.
- In October 2017, Seabased announced it would no longer expand the Sotenäs power plant as originally planned. At the time of the announcement, the site was not actively generating power, but Seabased planned to continue to use it for research and testing purposes.
- In late 2017, Fortum transferred ownership of the power station to Seabased. Seabased announced it would use the site for testing and technology demonstration.

== See also ==
- List of wave power stations
