= Ada Foah Wave Farm =

Wave farm in Ghana

- Country: Ghana
- Status: Operational
- Commission date: 2016
- Owner: TC's Energy
- Operator: Power Distribution Services Ghana

Wave power station
- Type: Point absorber
- Water body: South Atlantic Ocean

Power generation
- Units planned: 100 MW
- Nameplate capacity: 400 KW

The Ada Foah Wave Farm is Africa's first wave farm commissioned in Ada Foah, Ghana. The 400 KW wave farm pilot project was developed by Swedish company Seabased. On 20 March 2018, Seabased signed a contract with Ghanaian renewable energy developer TC's Energy to expand the project to 100 MW.

== See also ==
- List of power stations in Ghana
- List of wave power stations
