= Wavebob =

Wave energy converter

- Type: Privately Held
- Industry: Wave Energy
- Founded: 1999
- Headquarters: Ireland, USA,
- Key people: Andrew Parish -CEO; Göran Dandanell -Chairman; William Dick -Inventor; Dr. Jochem Weber -Research Manager; Dr. Ronan Costello -Hydraulics Team Leader
- Products: [WECs] Wave Energy Conversion Buoys

Wavebob was a wave energy converter which was in development between 1999 and 2013 when the company was closed owing to funding difficulties.

The device was an axisymetric self-reacting heaving buoy point absorber. It consisted of two oscillating structures, a floating collar or torus which followed the motion of the waves, and a central section containing the power-take-off at the top and a buoyancy-controlling tank below the water.

Wavebob Ltd. commenced the first of a number of sea trials in Galway Bay in Ireland during which it was tested as a 1/4 scale device for short periods at the SEAI 1/4 Scale Wave Power Testing facility which is located in the inner bay inside the natural Aran Islands breakwater and where devices under test are exposed to around 1/3 of the expected energy of the 'Full Atlantic Ocean'.

== Technology ==
Wavebob used the lift and fall of ocean waves to drive generators

The Wavebob consisted of two oscillating structures. These structures must be able to absorb in a variety of conditions and be robust to survive in the harsh marine environment. The structures are controlled by a damping system that can respond to predicted wave height, wave power and frequency. The tank structure (a semi-submerged body) uses captured sea water mass as the majority of its inertial mass. This significantly reduces the cost associated with structural materials.

The technology was developed over a decade, including tank testing at 1:100, 1:75, and 1:25 scale, benign sea conditions at 1:17 scale, and finally two sets of advanced development model (ADM) tests at 1:4 scale in Galway Bay. The first (ADM1) in 2006 produced power at sea for the first time, and the second (ADM2) in 2007 confirming the capability in a range of sea conditions.

Wavebob developed its business through an Open Innovation Model and was partnered with leading energy companies such as Chevron and Vattenfall. It briefly established a joint venture company with Vattenfall called Tonn Energy to develop commercial wave farms off the west coast of Ireland; tonn is the Irish language word for wave.

== Company milestones ==
1999: Original patents filed

2007: CEO appointed; head office in Maynooth established

2013: Company Closed Down.

== See also ==
- Wave power
- Marine Institute Ireland
- OE buoy
