= Wave power in the United States =

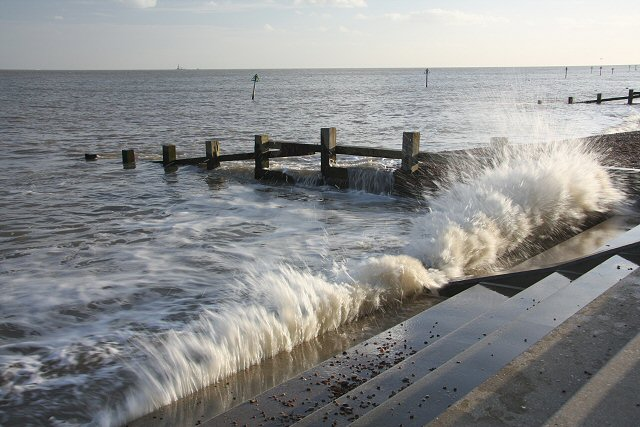
Harnessing the power of the oceans

Wave power in the United States is under development in several locations off the east and west coasts as well as Hawaii. It has moved beyond the research phase and is producing reliable energy for the Grid. Its use to-date has been for situations where other forms of energy production are not economically viable and as such, the power output is currently modest. But major installations are planned to come on-line within the next few years.

== Projects ==
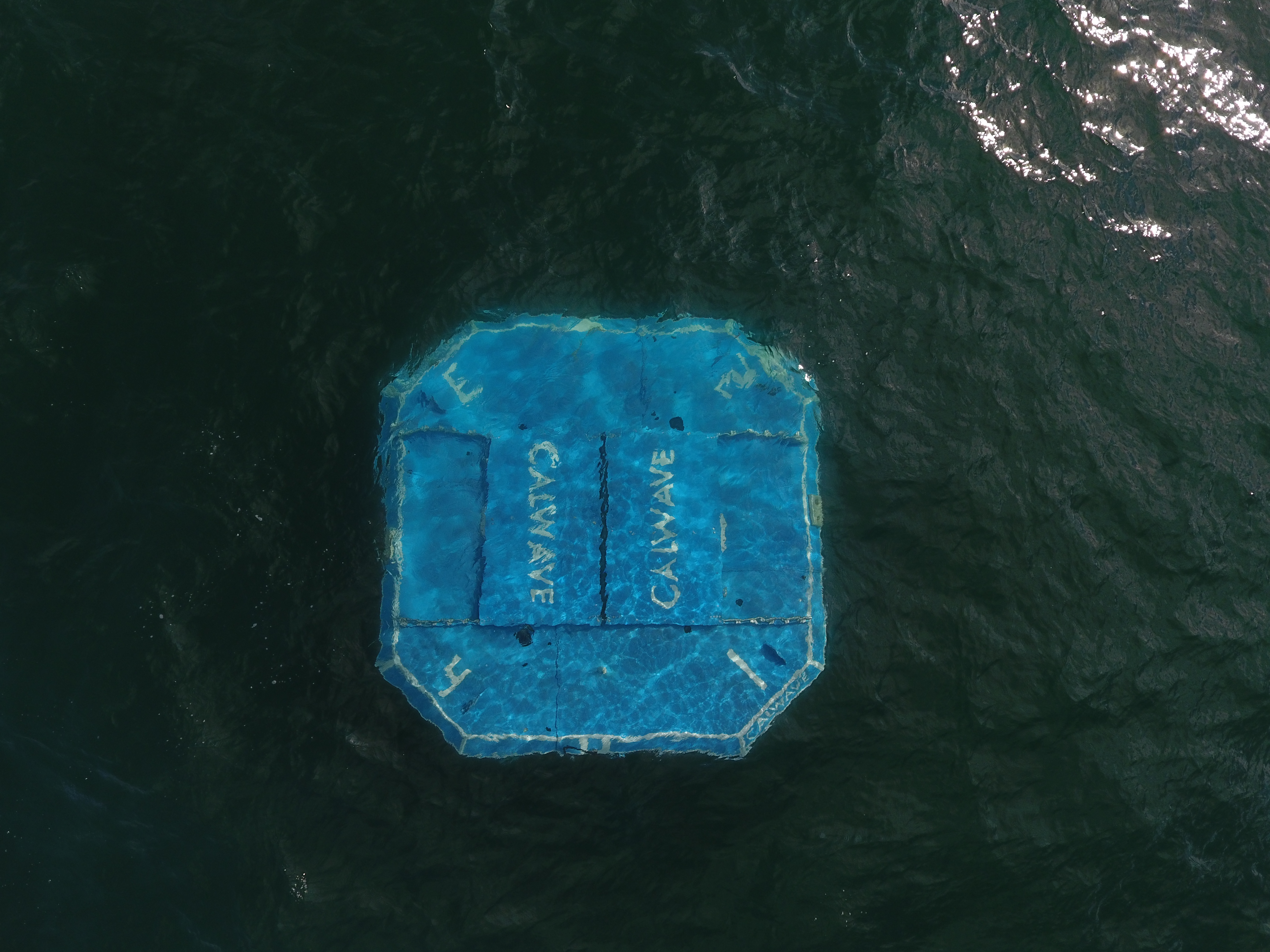
CalWave Power Technologies, Inc. wave energy converter operating fully submerged in California

=== San Diego, California ===
CalWave Power Technologies, Inc. successfully commissioned its CalWave x1™ on September 16, 2021, off the coast of San Diego. This event marks the beginning of California’s first at-sea, long-duration wave energy pilot operating fully submerged. The CalWave x1™ will be tested for six months with the goal of validating the performance and reliability of the system in open ocean. This project is supported by a United States Department of Energy award with the goal to demonstrate CalWave’s scalable and patented xWave™ technology. Several key partners collaborated with CalWave on this project including the Scripps Institution of Oceanography, the National Renewable Energy Laboratory, Sandia National Laboratories, DNV GL, and University of California, Berkeley.

=== LEAP Autonomous PowerBuoy, New Jersey ===
Ocean Power Technologies has successfully operated a system off New Jersey, designed and manufactured by Ocean Power Technologies, under the US Navy's Littoral Expeditionary Autonomous PowerBuoy (LEAP) program for coastal security and maritime surveillance.

=== Coos Bay, Oregon ===
Ocean Power Technologies has proposed a utility-scale, commercial wave park in North America at Coos Bay, Oregon. The planned size of this park is up to 100 megawatts, and it will be the largest wave energy project in the world when completed.

=== Reedsport, Oregon ===
Ocean Power Technologies is developing a commercial wave park on the west coast of the United States located 2.5 miles offshore near Reedsport, Oregon. The first phase of this project is for ten power generation systems (buoys), or 1.5 megawatts.

=== Oahu, Hawaii ===
From 2009 to 2011, Ocean Power Technologies ocean-tested its wave power generation system at the US Marine Corps Base Hawaii (MCBH) at Kaneohe Bay. The Oahu system was launched under the Company's program with the US Navy for ocean testing and demonstration of such systems, including connection to the Oahu grid.

=== Atlantic City, New Jersey ===
The principles demonstrated with the earlier prototype power generation buoys deployed and tested off the coast of Atlantic City were integrated into the designs of the power generation buoys for Hawaii and Spain.

== Research ==
The Department of Energy announced a $22 million grant to fund wave energy research by private companies and universities in January 2022.

Academic institutions conducting wave energy research include Portland State University, the University of Washington, and the O.H. Hinsdale Wave Research Laboratory at Oregon State University.

== See also ==
- Renewable energy in the United States
- Wave power
