= Oceanic Platform of the Canary Islands =

- Abbreviation: PLOCAN
- Formation: 5 April 2008
- Type: Consortium between the Government of Spain and the Government of the Canary Islands
- Purpose: Scientific research
- Coordinates: 27°59′32″N 15°22′6″W
- Region served: Worldwide
- Key people: José Joaquín Hernández Brito (Director) and Paula Pacheco (Executive Manager)
- Website: http://www.plocan.eu/index.php/en/

The Oceanic Platform of the Canary Islands (Plataforma Oceánica de Canarias, PLOCAN) is a singular scientific and technological infrastructure (ICTS) aimed to accelerate the development of knowledge and technologies for the responsible and sustainable use of the ocean, in line with the United Nations Sustainable Development Goals and strategy of Blue Growth Strategy established by the European Union. It has been partially co-funded by the European Regional Development Fund (ERDF) under the ERDF Operational Programme for the Canary Islands 2007-2013 within Axis 1 "Development of the Knowledge Economy", priority theme 02, with a co-financing rate of 85%. PLOCAN is financed and managed by a consortium comprising 50% contributions from the Government of the Canary Islands and the Spanish National Government (Ministry of Science, Innovation and Universities).

== Infrastructures ==
PLOCAN offers land-based and sea-based novel infrastructures to promote long-term observation and sustainability of the ocean, providing a cost-effective combination of services, such as observatories, a test site, a base for marine vehicles, training and an innovation hub. PLOCAN is able to provide access and multidisciplinary logistic support through its onshore facility and two marine test sites (Taliarte harbor and offshore). The facility and test sites are located in the NE coast of Gran Canaria Island, and the platform is integrated in the offshore test site.

=== The platform ===
The main aim of the PLOCAN consortium is the construction and operation of a fixed offshore platform that will underpin national research and technological development capacities at the cutting edge of knowledge and within the framework of international competitiveness. The floating platform is located about 1.3 miles (2.1 km; 1.1 nmi) east of Piedra Santa, Jinámar, Gran Canaria, and was anchored in place in November 2016

The platform is located both close to the coast and near the edge of the continental shelf, in shallow waters (30 meters depth). It has a net surface of around 2,500 m^{2} of research capacity, space for laboratories, instrumented containers and capacity to accommodate researchers distributed in a multi-story building with a main dock of 1,000 m^{2}.

=== Onshore facility ===
The onshore testing facility has dedicated 400 m^{2} equipped workshops for electronics and mechanical integration, repairs, storage and logistics, including a wet-lab with a testing pool with target seawater. A dedicated control room for piloting and related issues is also available.

=== Marine test sites (harbor and offshore) ===
The harbor testing facility is located very close to the onshore facility (just a few meters with a direct view between both) and has clear and calm waters with maximum depths of 8 m. It is an optimal place for the early sea trials.

The PLOCAN offshore test site area is 23 km^{2}, located 3 nautical miles from the harbour testing area and also quite near to the major harbor of Gran Canaria Island (Las Palmas/ Port). The area offers progressive depths from shore up to 600 m (deeper upon request) dedicated to study the behaviour and efficiency of different types of maritime devices and technologies and contributing to speed up the process of their introduction into the market. The marine area of PLOCAN test site was comprehensively studied with a view of offering an optimal space in terms of logistics, supported infrastructures and grid connection. In addition, the area has excellent environmental conditions facilitating 9 to 12 months of operational window and optimal wind and wave energy resources for testing/demonstration operations, which range from 300-400 W/m2 for wind power density and from 4 to 8 Kw/m of wave power.

=== Electrical and Communications Grid Infrastructure (IECOM) ===
The evacuation of the electricity produced during experimental assays in PLOCAN Marine Test Site is done through its Electrical and Communication grid Infrastructure (IECOM). The IECOM will be operational in 2017 and it will be composed of 2 main modules, each with 5 MW of electricity evacuation capacity. Module 1 will be dedicated to wave energy converter demonstrators, with 5 positions of 1 MW each. Module 2 will be dedicated to offshore wind technologies with one position of 5 MW. Regular sea-operations are covered by PLOCAN's own boats as part of the main equipment available.

=== Ocean Observing systems ===
A fleet of unmanned marine vehicles for survey and work applications up to 1,000 m and moored buoys suited with meteorological and oceanographic sensors are available in order to cover real-time monitoring needs in the area.

== Projects ==
PLOCAN is involved in European and national R&D&I projects with the objective of enabling research and scientific and technological development of maritime and marine sciences. Finished and ongoing projects can be consulted in a specific section of the PLOCAN webpage.

PivotBuoy received €4m EU funding in 2019 to install a 225 kW downwind floating wind turbine at PLOCAN.

In 2024, WavePiston installed their wave energy convertor at PLOCAN. This can both provide power and desalinated water.
