= Oceanlinx =

Company

- Industry: Renewable energy
- Founded: 1997
- Headquarters: Botany, New South Wales, Australia
- Website: www.oceanlinx.com

Oceanlinx was a company established in 1997 as Energetech Australia Pty Ltd. It specialised in the research and development of ocean-based renewable energy technology. The company's central technology was based on the Wave Energy Converter (WEC) which converts wave energy into electrical energy. Oceanlinx technology focused on the oscillating water column principle, and developed several prototype generators which were deployed and tested in Port Kembla, New South Wales. In 2014, Oceanlinx entered receivership and its technology, intellectual property, brand and trademark were sold to Wave Power Renewables of Hong Kong. Wave Power Renewables has continued to develop the technology, and Oceanlinx's founding director, Tom Denniss has further developed the technology since 2016 as a director of Wave Swell Energy.

== Technology ==
The wave energy conversion technology developed by Energetech and later Oceanlinx uses a bi-directional airflow air turbine, turbine installed on top of an oscillating water column; this turbine concept and others were developed specifically by Oceanlinx to accommodate waver energy conversion technology. The turbine and generator are the only moving part and sit above the water. The advantage is that fewer the moving parts the better and it means that the turbine is not in direct contact with the sea water.

Key innovations of the technology were variable-pitch turbine blades, and a concentrator to increase the amount of energy that can be extracted from the waves.

=== Oscillating Water Column & Turbines ===
Oscillating Water Columns (OWCs) are simple constructions that act like a piston and cylinder. As waves rise within the OWC, it replicates the action of a piston, driving a column of air ahead of it and through the turbine. Most turbines are designed to function with a constant flow in a single direction but OWC generates a bi-directional flow. Oceanlinx patented turbines can continue to generate electricity regardless of a change of direction under varying flow conditions.

=== Generator and Transmission System ===
The system will be matched to the turbine based on the available wave resource. The rated capacity of the generator will vary to best match the environmental conditions at the installed location. The firm was developing deep-water technology to generate electricity from easy-to-predict long-wavelength ocean swell oscillations.

== History ==
=== Energetech (1997–2006) ===
Energetech was founded in 1997 by Dr. Tom Denniss, as Energetech Australia Pty Ltd. During its 17-year life, it attracted approximately AUD$6.9 million in grant funding. In 1999 the company received an AUD$750,000 Federal Government Grant to develop a wave energy project at Port Kembla, New South Wales.

In 2001 Energetech closed a round of venture capital funding with the Connecticut Clean Energy fund in the United States. This allowed the company to establish a US subsidiary: Energetech America. The following year, four European companies invested US$4.5 million.

In 2003 a major milestone was reached with the construction and successful testing of the first full-scale Denniss-Auld turbine. Energetech America received grant funding of US$750,000 from two state renewable funds for the development and construction of a wave energy project in Rhode Island, USA.

In 2004, Energetech was awarded a AUD$1.21 million research and development grant by the Australian Government to facilitate its Wave Energy Optimisation program. Tom Engelsman joined Energetech as Chief Executive Officer appointed by the Board and succeeding Tom Denniss.

In 2005, Energetech launched an Industry Advisory Service division, and attracted further investment of AUD$500,000 from the Centre for Energy and Greenhouse Technologies.

In 2006, Energetech completed the installation of the Port Kembla MK1 prototype wave energy plant. The plant operated successfully for three years.

==== MK1/MK2 Prototype ====
The MK1 Port Kembla prototype was 36 m long by 35 m wide (118 by 115 ft) and weighed 485 tonnes. It was built approximately 200 metres (660 ft) from the harbour breakwater, and connected to the local electricity grid at 11 kV. First power was generated on 26 October 2005. The plant also incorporated desalination, producing up to 2000 litres of water per day.

In 2007, the device was redeveloped as the MK2, with a larger rated generation capacity of 1 MW.

=== Oceanlinx (2007–2014) ===
Energetech changed its name to Oceanlinx in April 2007. The following year, David Weaver was appointed as CEO, replacing Tom Engelsman. In 2009 Ali Baghaei was appointed CEO and MD and the MK1 prototype at Port Kembla was decommissioned.

==== MK3 Prototype ====
In 2010, the MK3 prototype was launched at Port Kembla and was successfully grid-connected for the first time. It was designed to generate 2.5MW of electricity. In May 2010 it broke free of its moorings and sank at the bottom of Port Kembla's eastern breakwater. Plans to remove the generator were delayed by years, exacerbated by the company entering receivership in April 2014. In December 2011, the Kilpatrick Group was engaged to remove the wave generator. In July 2012, Oceanlinx chief exposure Ali Baghaei said that a new contractor had been awarded the work, and that it would be removed within months. In March 2013, Roads & Maritime Services announced its intention sue Oceanlinx for failing to remove the generator. The action was dropped after an agreement of cooperation was reached with Oceanlinx. In July 2013, Oceanlinx's chairman Tibor Vertes said that Oceanlinx would attempt to remove the generator by the end of the year. The Illawarra based contractor Blue Sky Services was appointed to remove the wave generator in late 2013. The removal of the structure was undertaken in two phases, beginning in October 2016. The second phase involved refloating the remains of the structure and towing it 50 nautical miles offshore before scuttling it in June 2017.

==== GreenWAVE prototype ====
In 2012, Oceanlinx attracted funding to further develop its technology under the name GreenWAVE. The development of the GreenWAVE prototype was funded by the Australian Government (approx. AUD$4.4 million) and private investment (approx. AUD $3.6 million). The Australian public funding was provided by the Australian Renewable Energy Agency under the Emerging Renewables Program.

The prototype device with a generating capacity of 1MW was completed and unveiled in October 2013. It measured 24 metres long by 21 metres wide and weighed 3,000 tonnes. The structure was designed to have no moving parts below the water line to require no mooring or anchorage. It was intended to sit 4 kilometres offshore from Port Macdonnell, where it would provide electricity for local consumption via a deal with Diamond Energy.

In 2014, the four-day journey to tow the GreenWAVE prototype into place at Port Macdonnell began. During towing, the airbags supporting the unit sustained damage, causing the unit to lean. The GreenWAVE generator was then towed to shallow water near Carrickalinga, South Australia, where it sank to the seabed and remains stranded. The incident led the company into receivership and the prototype was abandoned by the appointed manager.

As of 2020, residents of Carrickalinga continue to lobby the Government of South Australia to remove the structure. In October 2020 it was announced that the partial removal efforts scheduled for October–November that year would be delayed due to poor weather, and would instead be carried out January–March 2021.

==== Receivership and intellectual property ====
Following the GreenWAVE accident, Oceanlinx entered receivership in 2014. The technology, IP, brand and trademark were sold to Wave Power Renewables Limited.

In 2016, inventor Tom Denniss and founding director of Oceanlinx (as Energetech Australia Pty Ltd) established the new public, unlisted Australian company Wave Swell Energy to commercialise his Oscillating Water Column wave generation technology.
