= Aktiebolag =

Swedish form of limited company or corporation

Aktiebolag (Swedish pronunciation: [ˈâktsɪɛbʊˌlɑːɡ], "stock company") is the Swedish term for "limited company" or "corporation". When used in company names, it is abbreviated as "AB" (in Sweden), "Ab" (in Finland), or, rarely, "A/B" (dated), roughly equivalent to the abbreviations Corp., Ltd., and PLC. The state authority responsible for the registration of aktiebolag in Sweden is the Swedish Companies Registration Office.

== Sweden ==
All aktiebolag are divided into two categories: private limited companies and public limited companies. The name of a private limited company may not contain the word publikt ("public") and the name of a public limited company may not contain the word privat or pvt. ("private").

=== Public ===
A public limited company (publikt aktiebolag) is legally denoted as "AB (publ.)" in Sweden or "Abp" in Finland. A Swedish public limited company must have a minimum share capital of 500,000 Swedish kronor and its shares can be offered to the public on the stock market. The suffix "(publ.)" is sometimes omitted in texts of an informal nature, but according to the Swedish Companies Registration Office, "the name of a public limited company must be mentioned with the term (publ.) after the business name in the articles of association and elsewhere", unless it is clearly understood from the company’s business name that the company is a public limited company.

=== Private ===
For a private limited company in Sweden (privat aktiebolag), the minimum share capital is 25,000 Swedish kronor. The main Swedish statutes regulating limited companies are the Companies Act (Aktiebolagslagen (ABL) 2005:551) and the Limited Companies Ordinance (Aktiebolagsförordningen 2005:559). The ABL stipulates that parent companies and subsidiaries are separate legal persons and legal entities.

=== Examples ===
Companies such as EA Digital Illusions CE AB, Ericsson AB, MySQL AB, Mojang AB, Spotify AB, Scania AB and Hi3G Access AB use AB in their names. Other companies have included it in their abbreviated trading name, such as Saab AB (formerly Svenska Aeroplan AB), SSAB AB (formerly Svenskt Stål AB), HIAB (Hydrauliska Industri AB), ESAB (Elektriska Svetsnings-Aktiebolaget) and LKAB (Luossavaara-Kiirunavaara Aktiebolag).

== Finland ==
The term aktiebolag is also used in Finland Swedish, alongside the Finnish osakeyhtiö; the choice and ordering of terms tends to indicate the company's primary working language.
