= Wave power in Australia =

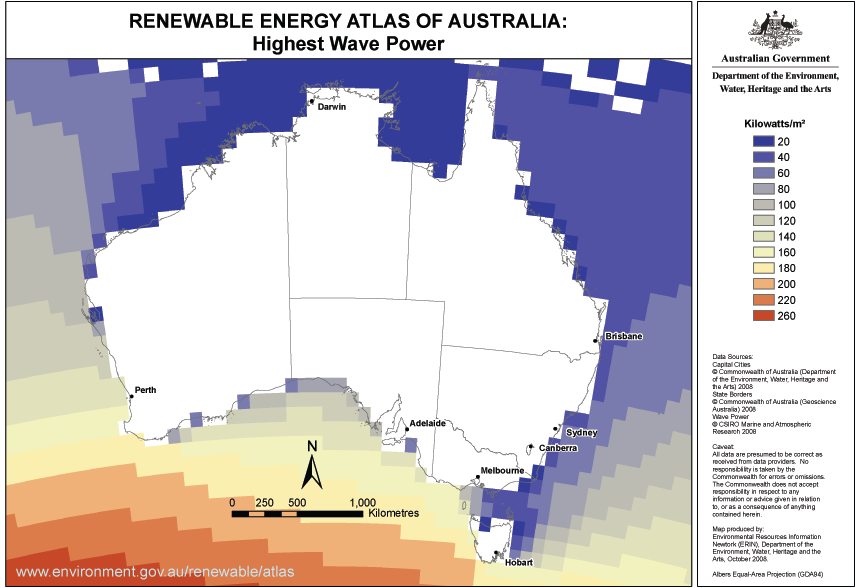
Wave Power in kilowatts/square metre in the waters around Australia

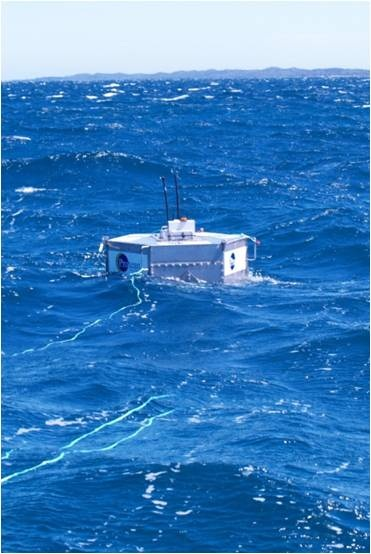
Protean Energy Wave Energy Converter prototype trial, 2008

Wave power in Australia is being developed as the country has a long and largely deep-water coastline. It is one of several regions of the world where wave power projects are being considered. Australia has great potential for wave energy because strong Southern Ocean winds generate consistently large waves ideal for wave energy production. The main challenges are capital cost and withstanding damage from harsh ocean conditions.

== Projects ==
In early 2015 the Perth wave energy project was commissioned.

Ocean Power Technologies (Australasia) is developing a 19 megawatts wave power station connected to the grid near Portland, Victoria. The project has received an $66.46 million grant from the federal government of Australia.

Oceanlinx is trialling a wave energy system at Port Kembla - Thousands of air filled balloons are submerged under water and energy is collected by the changes in the depth of the water column changing the pressure in the balloons.

A wave power project is being developed at Douglas Point, South Australia.

BioPower Systems are developing their bioWAVE system anchored to the seabed that would generate electricity through the movement of buoyant blades as waves pass, in a swaying motion similar to the way sea plants, such as kelp, move. It expects to complete pilot wave and tidal projects off northern Tasmania this year.

Inside Western Australia, Carnegie Wave Energy are refining a technology called CETO, which uses energy captured from passing waves to generate high-pressure sea water. This is piped onshore to drive a turbine and to create desalinated water. A series of large buoys is tethered to piston pumps anchored in waters 15 to 50 metres (49 to 164 ft) deep. The rise and fall of passing waves drives the pumps, generating water pressures of up to 1,000 pounds per square inch (psi). Carnegie's first commercial wave farm is due to be completed on Garden Island, near Perth, Western Australia, by mid 2014.

Wave Swell Energy installed a trial wave generator unit in the harbour at Grassy, King Island. It is a 200 kW unit which is connected to the island's existing microgrid, which also utilises like wind, solar, battery and diesel. The trial was a success. It had an average conversion rate of 48%.

== See also ==
- Renewable energy in Australia
