= List of wave power stations =

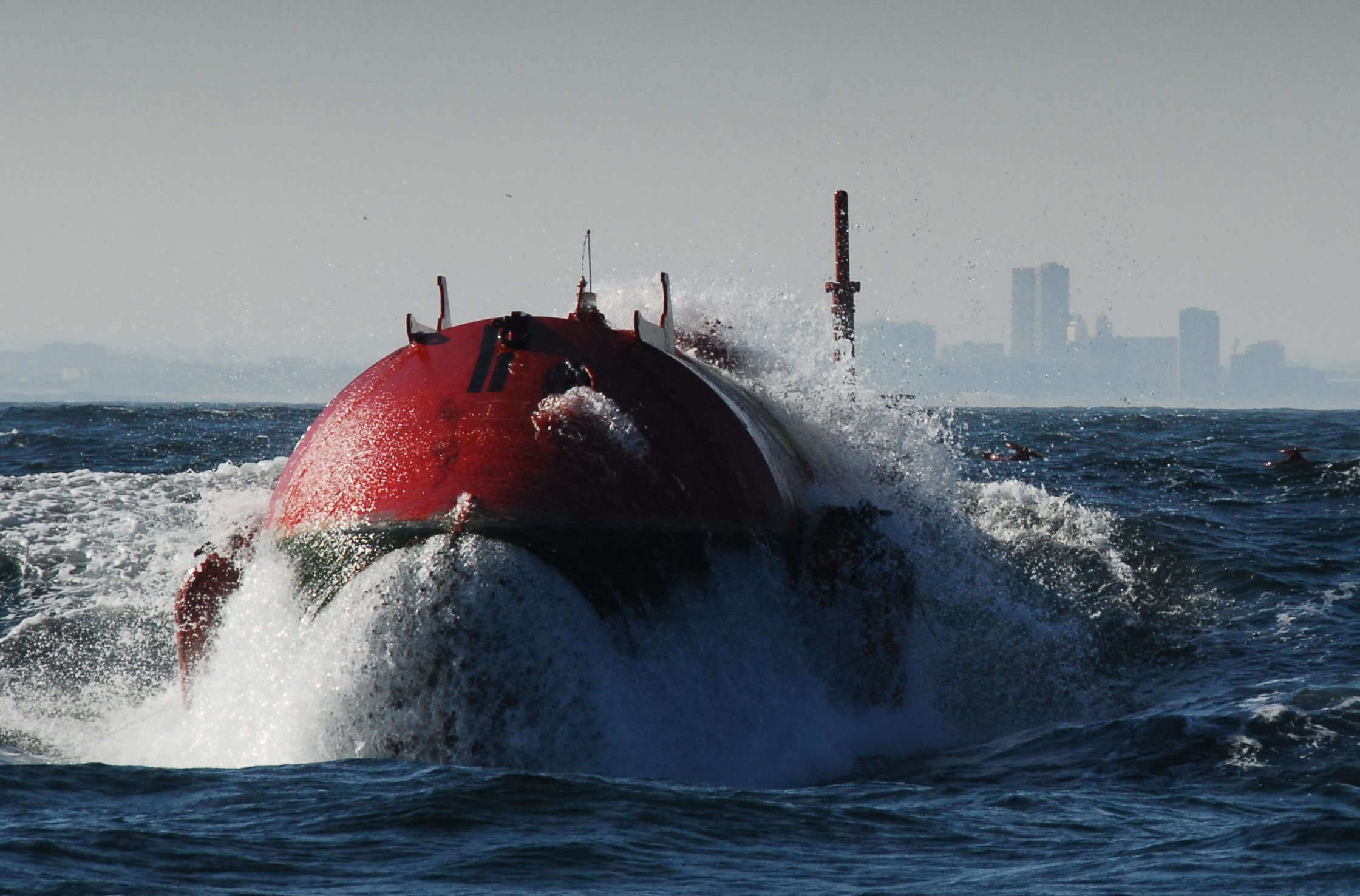
Agucadoura Wave Farm in Portugal

This page lists most power stations that run on wave power. However, there are not many operational at present, as wave energy is still a nascent technology. A longer list of proposed and prototype wave power devices is given at List of wave power projects.

Wave farms are classified into eight types based on the technology used: surface-following attenuator, point absorber, oscillating wave surge converter, oscillating water column, overtopping/terminator, submerged pressure differential, bulge wave device, and rotating mass.

== Wave farms ==
| Station | Country | Location | Capacity (MW) | Type | Operation | Notes |
|---|---|---|---|---|---|---|
| Ada Foah Wave Farm | Ghana | | 0.4 | Point absorber | 2016 | |
| Agucadoura Wave Farm (Pelamis). | Portugal | 41°25′57″N 08°50′33″W | 2.25 | Surface-following attenuator | July 2008-November 2008 | |
| Azura | United States | | 0.02 | Point absorber | 2015 | |
| BOLT Lifesaver | United States | | 0.03 | Point absorber | 2016 | |
| CETO | Australia | Western Australia | | | 2015 | Two submerged buoys anchored to the seabed generate energy through hydraulic pressure. |
| Gibraltar Wave Farm | Gibraltar | Gibraltar | .1 | Surface attenuator | 2016 | |
| Islay Limpet | United Kingdom | 55°41′24″N 06°31′15″W | 0.5 | Oscillating water column | 2000–2012 | |
| Mutriku Breakwater Wave Plant | Spain | 43°18′26″N 2°23′6″W | 0.3 (296 kW from 16 turbines and 16 OWCs.) | Oscillating water column | 2011–date | Lifetime generation of over 3 GWh by the end of 2023. |
| Ocean RusEnergy | Russia | Yekaterinburg | N | Small-scale | 2013 | |
| Pico Wave Power Plant | Portugal | | 0.4 | Oscillating water column | 2010 | |
| Runde Demo Site | Norway | | 0.1 | Oscillating water column | 2017 | |
| SDE Sea Waves Power Plant | Israel | 32°05′59″N 34°46′24″E | 0.04 | Oscillating wave surge converter | 2009 | |
| SINN Power wave energy converter | Greece | 35.352161°N 25.156061°E | 0.02 | Point absorber | 2015 | |
| Sotenäs Wave Power Station | Sweden | 58°22′45″N 11°08′57″E | 3 | Point absorber | 2015 | |

== See also ==
- Marine power
