= Azura (wave power device) =

Wave power device tested in Hawaii

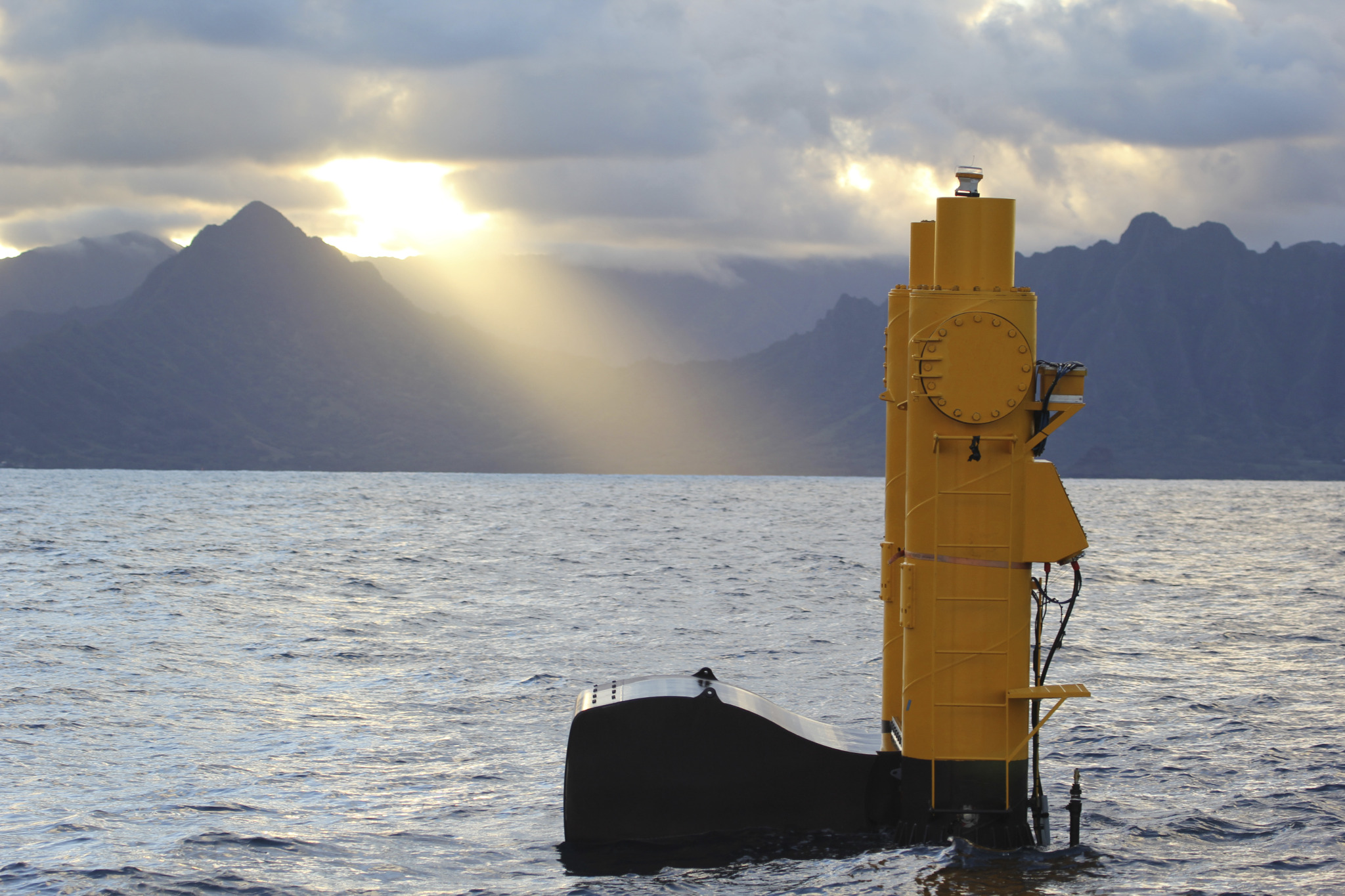
- Azura prototype testing
- Country: United States
- Location: Marine Corps Base Hawaii
- Coordinates: 21.46488°N 157.751524°W
- Status: Decommissioned
- Construction began: 2006
- Commission date: 2012
- Operator: NWEI

Wave power station
- Type: Point absorber
- Water body: Kāneʻohe Bay
- Water depth: 30 m (98 ft)

Power generation
- Units operational: 1 × 20 KW
- Make and model: TRL 5/6
- Nameplate capacity: 20 KW

External links
- Website: azurawave.com

Azura is a wave power device developed by Azura Wave Power in New Plymouth. A version was tested in Hawaii from 2015 for several years, with the aim of scaling up to create utility scale power for the grid. This was found to be too expensive, so Azura are now working on a smaller-scale device to produce both electricity and potable water. Two devices have been tested, which can generate 20 kilowatts of power.

The test in Hawaii was connected to the municipal grid providing electricity to Hawaii for 18-months. According to the United States Department of Energy, this is the first time that a wave power generator has been officially verified to be supplying energy to a power grid in North America. It was verified by the University of Hawaii. The tests were at the Marine Corps Base Hawaii Wave Energy Test Site (WETS) on the north shore of Kaneohe Bay, Oahu. It was situated on the surface of a 30-meter-deep berth where it was monitored.

This prototype (TRL 5/6) was developed by Northwest Energy Innovations (NWEI) with the support of the U.S. Navy, the United States Department of Energy, and the University of Hawaii. During the operational testing, the University of Hawaii would be responsible for the collection and analysis of data.

Azura was originally named "WET-NZ" from "Wave Energy Technology-New Zealand".

== Background ==
Development was in 2006 by Callaghan Innovation and was first called WET-NZ. The initial concept was called the TRL 1, entered the micro-modeling stage under the name TRL 3, and is being tested in the open ocean with large scale prototypes called TRL 5/6 deployed near Christchurch, New Zealand

== Description and operation ==
Azura floats on the surface of the sea and weighs 45 tons (41 tonnes). It has a unique floating mechanism that can rotate 360 degrees. This enables it to extract power from horizontal (surge) as well as vertical (heave) wave motion. It has reserve buoyancy that is very low, allowing it to partially submerge beneath large waves.

Point absorber

Azura is a point absorber. This means that it uses a floating surface mechanism to absorb the energy of waves from different directions. This is the most common type of deepwater wave energy generator. The generator is driven with a high-pressure hydraulics system. The wave motion is captured by the circular rotation of the floating mechanism, and translated to crankshafts within the Azura. These crankshafts provide the motion for the high pressure hydraulic system.

== Environmental Considerations ==
Many agencies have overseen and conducted assessments on the project prior to implementation. These included US Army Corps of Engineers, the US Coast Guard, the US Fish and Wildlife Service, and the National Marine Fisheries Service. Oregon-based Department of State Lands, Department of Land Conservation and Development, and Department of Fish and Wildlife reviewed the project as well.

== Preliminary tests ==
The initial phase of development used a smaller prototype that was tested in a wave tank.

A second prototype was then installed in 2012 for a 6-week period at the Northwest National Marine Renewable Energy Center’s test site off the coast of Oregon in an open-sea area. During that test, the device was exposed to wave heights of up to 3.75-meters in a 12 to 14-second sea state.

Both tests were successful.

== Future plans ==
Northwest Energy Innovations (NWEI) used information gathered during the test in Hawaii to further develop the project. With the Department of Energy providing an additional $5 million, NWEI planned to modify Azura to increase its efficiency and improve reliability. A new design was then expected to be tested at full-scale, generating between 500 kilowatts and one megawatt of power. This was to be situated in a 60 to 80-meter-deep (100–150 feet) berth. One megawatt is sufficient to provide electricity to several hundred homes.

The megawatt-scale device was never built, as it was found not to be commercially viable. Instead the company are targeting off-grid markets such as aquaculture and remote island communities that typically use competitively expensive diesel generators to provide electricity. The new devices will be transportable in standard 40-foot shipping containers, reducing transport costs.

== See also ==
- Wave farm
- List of wave power stations
