= Ministry of Climate and Enterprise (Sweden) =

Government ministry of Sweden

Coordinates: 59°19′56.3″N 18°03′32.8″E

- Klimat- och näringsdepartementet
- Lesser Coat of Arms

Agency overview
- Formed: 1 January 1969 (Ministry of Enterprise); 1 January 2023 (Ministry of Climate and Enterprise)
- Preceding agency: Ministry of the Environment (2022)
- Jurisdiction: SFS 1996:1515
- Headquarters: Herkulesgatan 17, Stockholm, Sweden
- Employees: 346 (2024)
- Annual budget: SEK 466 million (2025)
- Ministers responsible: Ebba Busch, Head of the Ministry Minister for Energy, Business and Industry; Romina Pourmokhtari, Minister for Climate and the Environment
- Parent agency: Government Offices (Note: Before 1 January 1975, the Government Offices was called the Royal Chancery.)
- Website: www.government.se

The Ministry of Climate and Enterprise (Swedish: Klimat- och näringsdepartementet) is a ministry in the Government of Sweden responsible for policies related to the climate, the natural environment, energy, enterprise, innovation, radiation safety, the 2030 Agenda for Sustainable Development, outdoor life and circular economy.

The ministry is currently headed by the Minister for Energy, Business and Industry Ebba Busch of the Christian Democrats. Busch is also Deputy Prime Minister of Sweden.

== History ==
The ministry originally held the name of Ministry of Industry (Industridepartementet) from its establishment in 1969. The ministry has later been called Ministry of Industry, Employment and Communications (Näringsdepartementet), Ministry of Enterprise and Innovation (Näringsdepartementet), Ministry of Enterprise and Innovation (Näringsdepartementet), and Ministry of Climate and Enterprise (Klimat- och näringslivsdepartementet).

The ministry was reshaped on 1 January 2023 when the Ministry of the Environment was merged into the Ministry of Enterprise and Innovation, forming the Ministry for Climate and Enterprise.

It's located on Herkulesgatan 17 in Stockholm.

== Government agencies and other bodies ==
=== Government agencies ===
The Ministry of Climate and Enterprise is principal for 21 government agencies, one state-owned company and five funds:

- Competition Authority (Konkurrensverket)
- Patent and Registration Office (Patent- och registreringsverket)
- National Space Agency (Rymdstyrelsen)
- Geological Survey (Sveriges geologiska undersökning)
- Vinnova (Verket för innovationssystem)
- Agency for Economic and Regional Growth (Tillväxtverket)
- Companies Registration Office (Bolagsverket)
- Growth Policy Analysis (Myndigheten för tillväxtpolitiska utvärderingar och analyser)
- Board for Accreditation and Conformity Assessment (Styrelsen för ackreditering och teknisk kontroll)
- Energy Agency (Energimyndigheten)
- Energy Markets Inspectorate (Energimarknadsinspektionen)
- National Electrical Safety Board (Elsäkerhetsverket)
- Svenska kraftnät (Svenska kraftnät)
- Oil Crisis Committee (Oljekrisnämnden)
- Meteorological and Hydrological Institute (SMHI)
- Radiation Safety Authority (Strålsäkerhetsmyndigheten)
- Formas (Forskningsrådet för miljö, areella näringar och samhällsbyggande (FORMAS))
- Agency for Marine and Water Management (Havs- och vattenmyndigheten)
- Environmental Protection Agency (Naturvårdsverket)
- Geotechnical Institute (Statens geotekniska institut)
- Chemicals Agency (Kemikalieinspektionen)

=== Government funds ===
- Mistra (Stiftelsen för miljöstrategisk forskning)
- International Institute for Industrial Environmental Economics (Internationella Miljöinstitutet)
- Stockholm Environment Institute (SEI)
- Industrifonden
- Norrlandsfonden

=== State-owned companies ===
- Environmental Research Institute (IVL Svenska Miljöinstitutet)

== Policy areas ==
- Energy
- Enterprise and industry
- Environment and climate
- Innovation

== See also ==
- Ministry of the Environment (1987–2022)
