= Johannes Falnes =

Norwegian physicist and professor

- Born: 15 December 1931; Skudenes, Norway
- Died: 2 June 2024 (aged 92); Trondheim, Norway
- Citizenship: Norwegian
- Education: Norwegian Institute of Technology
- Scientific career
- Fields: Experimental physics Wave energy
- Workplaces: Norwegian University of Science and Technology

Johannes Falnes (1931–2024) was a Professor Emeritus of Experimental Physics at the Department of Physics of the Norwegian University of Science and Technology noted for his contributions to wave energy research. He was one of the pioneers of modern wave energy research.

== Education ==
Falnes received his master's and doctoral degrees both from the Norwegian Institute of Technology.

== Career ==
Falnes spent his career at the Norwegian Institute of Technology (1956–1959), CERN (1959–1961), the University of Bergen (1961–1964), the Norwegian Institute of Technology/Norwegian University of Science and Technology (1965–2001), and SINTEF (1966–1972), before retiring in 2002.

Falnes' main research interest has been ocean wave energy and its utilisation. Together with Kjell Budal, he initiated wave energy research in Norway in the 1970s. Falnes and Budal discovered the so-called antenna effect, where a floating point absorber could theoretically absorb far more wave energy from the sea than that which is directly incident upon its geometry, analogous to a radio antenna's ability to absorb radio waves. They also developed the latching control strategy to maximize energy extraction.

In December 2006, a seminar titled Challenges for Wave Energy Technology was dedicated in tribute to Falnes on his 75th anniversary. The seminar was held in Trondheim, Norway. Wave energy experts such as Stephen Salter (University of Edinburgh), António Falcão (Instituto Superior Técnico), Alain Clément (École centrale de Nantes), and Richard Yemm (Ocean Power Delivery) addressed various topics in the seminar.

Falnes is a member of The Royal Norwegian Society of Sciences and Letters and the Norwegian Academy of Technological Sciences.

== Personal life ==
Among his pastimes are hiking and cross-country skiing.

== Selected publications ==
- Budal, K. & Falnes, J. (1975), "A resonant point absorber of ocean-wave power", Nature, 256 (5517): 478–479, Bibcode:1975Natur.256..478B, doi:10.1038/256478a0, S2CID 4253462
- Falnes, Johannes (2002). "Optimum Control of Oscillation of Wave-Energy Converters". International Journal of Offshore and Polar Engineering. 12 (4): 147–155.
- Johannes Falnes (2002). Ocean Waves and Oscillating Systems. Cambridge University Press. ISBN 0-521-78211-2.
- Falnes, Johannes (2007). "A review of wave-energy extraction". Marine Structures. 20 (4): 185–201. Bibcode:2007MaStr..20..185F. doi:10.1016/j.marstruc.2007.09.001.
