= CalWave Power Technologies =

American wave energy company

CalWave Inc. former name CalWave Power Technologies, Inc., is an American wave energy company. The startup focuses on developing energy technologies that tap ocean energy. It is noted for engineering the device called xWave technology. CalWave is based in Oakland, California.

== History ==
CalWave emerged from a collaboration between the University of California Berkeley's Theoretical and Applied Fluid Dynamics Laboratory and CalWave, which was led by Marcus Lehmann, who was then a visiting student-researcher. CalWave's journey began with a unique inspiration: the concept of geomimicry. Unlike biomimicry, which emulates biological processes, geomimicry draws from geological phenomena. At the University of California, Berkeley's Mechanical Engineering department in 2012, Marcus Lehmann, co-founder and CEO of, CalWave, was inspired by the natural vibrations of the ocean floor to extract energy. This idea led to the development of a membrane-like wave energy converter that operates submerged in the mid-water column, rather than on the surface. Lehmann and team built the proof-of-concept prototypes for his master's thesis, which proved to be effective in extracting wave energy. The team developed an invention of Reza Alam called "wave carpet". This technology acts like a seafloor and absorbs wave impact energy. The founding team was part of the first cohort of Cyclotron Road fellowship where co-founders Thomas Boerner CTO and Nigel Kojimoto VP of Engineering joined. CalWave later used the prize money it obtained to continue CalWave after graduation. In 2016 CalWave first successfully tested a 1:20 scale prototype. CalWave's xWave technology was one of the winners of the Wave Energy Prize. During the competition, CalWave was one of the four teams that passed the goal of doubling the energy captured from ocean waves.

== xWave ==
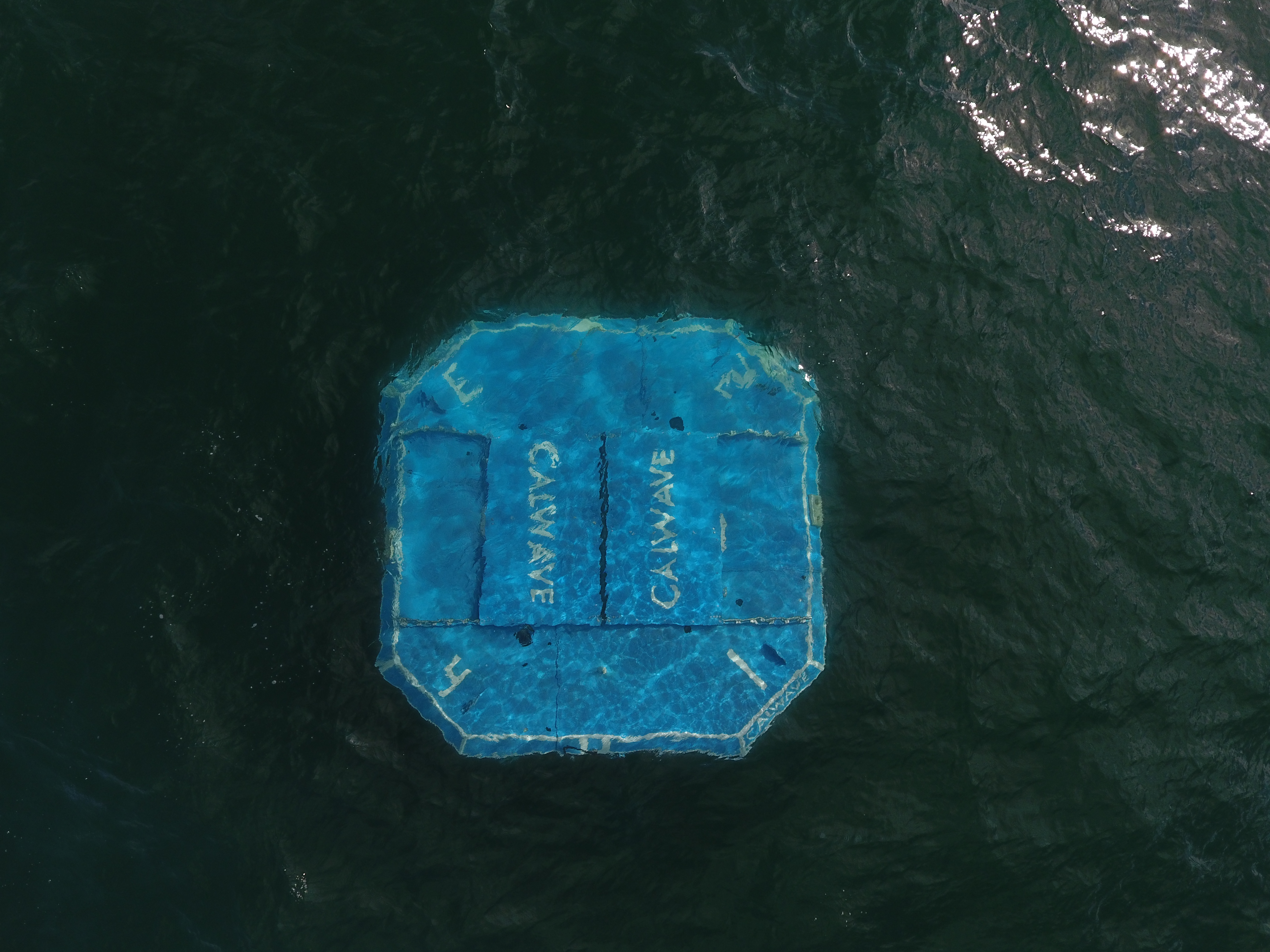
CalWave x1 WEC Pilot Unit

The xWave wave energy converter is classified as a submerged pressure differential device operating fully submerged at all times. It is capable of sheltering in storms with active load management capabilities comparable to pitch & yaw control of the modern wind turbine.

=== San Diego field trial ===
In 2017 as a follow on the US Wave Energy Prize, CalWave was awarded a US DOE award to conduct an open ocean pilot. In 2022, CalWave completed the open-ocean energy project off the coast of San Diego . It is considered California's first at-sea, long-duration wave energy project. The project attempted to demonstrate the viability of xWave - the company's scalable and patented sustainable energy solution. It is engineered as a submersible device that can generate power from waves and can transmit electricity through an undersea cable linked to the Scripps Institution of Oceanography's research pier.

An independent biological evaluation prepared before deployment concluded that the project was not likely to adversely affect listed species, and post-installation monitoring using cameras, dive surveys and bottom-mounted hydrophones recorded no collisions involving marine mammals, fish, birds or sea turtles; a 360-degree camera study published in the Journal of Marine Science and Engineering observed fish aggregating near one of the device's anchors. The pilot's monitoring program was presented as one of five international case studies at an OES-Environmental and ORJIP Ocean Energy workshop held at ICOE-OEE 2022 in San Sebastián.

=== Oregon pilot at PacWave ===
The next commercial scale pilot is supported by the US Department of Energy, which allocated $25 million in funding to support research and development on wave power. Out of the eight recipients of the DOE grant, Calwave received the largest funding, totaling $7.5 million. CalWave is already constructing a wave energy facility off the coast of Oregon as part of an $80 million project of the Oregon State University and the DOE. The project, called PacWave South, will study multiple wave energy generation concepts and will allow developers to quickly test their designs. Once completed, it will become the first commercial-scale, grid-connected wave energy test site in the United States.

=== Third-party qualification ===
Under the DOE-funded TEAMER program, the American Bureau of Shipping (ABS) has reviewed the xWave under its New Technology Qualification (NTQ) process, a staged path toward certification. ABS issued Statements of Maturity for the first two stages, "Technology Feasible" and "Concept Verified", on 1 November 2022. A subsequent review at the prototype-validation stage, published in July 2026, concluded that the device's novel systems were capable of performing their intended functions as defined in the project's system requirements, while noting that prototype testing and independent structural analysis were outside its scope and that further work would be required for full prototype-stage qualification; ABS and CalWave agreed that the resulting statement of maturity would carry conditions and review comments.

== Other Projects ==
Looking ahead, CalWave is focused on deploying its commercial-scale unit at PacWave and moving into serial manufacturing. The company aims to be an Original Equipment Manufacturer (OEM), selling units and providing support services. “We plan to support owner-operators in their planning and installation, similar to the model used in the wind turbine industry,” said Lehmann.

The company is also exploring opportunities to address energy poverty in remote communities. CalWave is working with a First Nation community in British Columbia to help them gain energy independence.

CalWave had also signed a deal with Alaska as part of the state's initiative of deploying solutions to climate and environmental issues that affect it.

In March 2024, the company was chosen by the Mowachaht/Muchalaht First Nations project to be the technology used in an indigenous-led initiative in Yuquot, British Columbia.

Ys (project developer), Azura Wave Power and CalWave (the two technology developers) have signed a tripartite Memorandum of Understanding to launch two wave energy demonstrators in Tahiti. The objective is to prove that it is possible to produce carbon-free electricity thanks to the force of Polynesian waves and make French Polynesia more energy self-sufficient.

In June 2024 the company signed a memorandum of understanding with AltaSea, an ocean institute at the Port of Los Angeles, concerning the development of wave energy projects off the California coast. CalWave had earlier signed a memorandum of understanding with Launch Alaska on the planning of wave energy projects in Alaska.

== Advocacy ==
CalWave is a member of the National Hydropower Association's Marine Energy Council (MEC), the U.S. national trade group dedicated to promoting technologies and related services to harness the significant untapped marine energy resources. Lehmann serves as the 2026 Council Leadership Vice Chair.

In March 2022 Lehmann testified at a New Jersey General Assembly committee hearing on wave energy. CalWave supported California Senate Bill 605, signed in October 2023, which directed state agencies to evaluate the potential of wave and tidal energy.
