= WavePiston =

Danish wave power concept

Wavepiston A/S
- Industry: Wave Energy
- Founded: 2014; 11 years ago
- Headquarters: Helsingør, Denmark
- Key people: Michael Henriksen (CEO)
- Products: Wave energy converters
- Website: wavepiston.dk

Wavepiston is a concept to harness wave power using a long string with collector plates that move with the waves. Hydraulic pumps between the plates pump water onshore, where it can either drive a turbine to create electricity or be used in desalination.

The concept has been developed since 2009, with Wavepiston A/S incorporated in 2014, based in Helsingør, Denmark.

The first full-scale device was installed off the coast of Gran Canaria in early 2024.

== Device concept ==
The device is a floating string with a series of plates, or energy collectors, spaced along it. These move back and forward with the passing waves and the relative motion is used to drive hydraulic pumps that suck in and pressurise seawater. This pressurised water is then sent onshore where it can drive a turbine to create electricity and/or be used in a reverse osmosis desalination plant.

By incorporating multiple collectors on a single string, the wave forces on each collector help to "cancel out" the forces transmitted to the moorings. This means the device only needs two small moorings. The string is formed from a steel wire rope, and has a slack mooring at each end.

As the device sits just below the sea surface, it has a low visual profile, and thus could be a good fit for tourist destinations.

Wavepiston claim that as their device uses lightweight modular components, the costs are significantly reduced.

== History ==
The concept has been developed since 2009, when the first patent was awarded. Since then it has been tested at increasing scales. In 2010, tank testing was performed at 1:30 scale in the wave basin at Aalborg University. This was followed by sea trials in Nissum Bredning at 1:9 scale and at Hanstholm at 1:2 scale. There were also plans to test a device at Isola Piana, on the south-west coast of Sardinia as part of the Wave to Energy and Water (W2EW) project.

=== Half-scale tests at Hastholm ===
Between 2015 and 2019, Wavepiston tested a half-scale device at the DanWEC site outside Hanstholm Harbour. In 2019, Wavepiston concluded two years of sea testing of a 120 m long string with four energy collector plates on it. Four variants of the energy collector plates were tested, each with an increasing area, from 4 m^{2} to 8.5 m^{2}. These tests had a few incidents. In September 2015, a trawler deviated into the navigational restriction and collided with the device, severely damaging it. In May 2018, the wire rope broke due to fatigue, so it was then redesigned.

=== Full-scale test at PLOCAN, Grand Canaria ===
In 2024, Wavepiston is testing their first full-scale device, at the Oceanic Platform of the Canary Islands (Plataforma Oceánica de Canarias, PLOCAN). This device is 200 metres (660 ft) long, fitted with 24 energy collectors each 8 metres (26 ft) wide. This has a power of around 200 kW, enough to supply either electricity for around 140 households or to supply desalinated water for around 900 households (150,000 m^{3} per year).

The first energy collector was installed on 8 February, and the full system was installed by June. The energy collectors were manufactured by Thune Eureka in Pontevedra, Galicia, Spain.

== Future plans ==
In 2024, Wavepiston started collaborating with Danish offshore wind developer Ørsted to investigate the potential for co-location of wave energy within offshore wind farms in Denmark. The aim is to make better utilisation of the sea space devoted to offshore energy. It is expected that co-locating the wind and wave energy with shared infrastructure will reduce both costs and intermittency of the electricity generated.

In March 2024, Wavepiston also announced they were working with the government in Barbados to conduct a pre-feasibility study into constructing wave farms in Barbados.

It is expected that a scaled-up future commercial system with 70 strings, each with 32 collectors, would have a rated power of 15 MW. In 2021, Wavepiston had hoped to be selling these by 2023. However, by 2023 they expected to launch utility-scale projects by 2032.
