= Swedish Competition Authority =

Swedish government agency

The Swedish Competition Authority (Swedish: Konkurrensverket, abbreviated KKV) is a Swedish government agency organized under the Ministry of Enterprise tasked to promote and safeguard competition in the private and public sector, to the benefit of all consumers and market participants. The agency ensures that contracting authorities comply with public procurement rules, propose legislative changes to improve competition, disseminates information about the rules that apply, and provides grants for research on competition and procurement.

== History ==
The agency was founded in 1992, when it replaced the National Price and Competition Board (Swedish: Statens pris- och konkurrensverk) and Office of the Competition Ombudsman (Swedish: Näringsfrihetsombudsmannen).

In 2007 the Board for Public Procurement (Swedish: Nämnden för offentlig upphandling) was dissolved, and its operations – oversight on public procurement – were taken over by the Swedish Competition Authority.

== Organisation ==
The agency is based in Stockholm. It is led by a director-general, and is organised in several units.

== See also ==
- Ministry of Enterprise, Energy and Communications (Sweden)
- Government procurement
