= Wells turbine =

Wells-Turbine 1 pipe wall 2 Axis 3 Hub 4 Turbine blade 5 Resulting force vector 6 direction of rotation 7 air flow (can also be in the other direction)

The Wells turbine is a low-pressure air turbine that rotates continuously in one direction independent of the direction of the air flow. Its blades feature a symmetrical airfoil with its plane of symmetry in the plane of rotation and perpendicular to the air stream.

It was developed for use in oscillating water column wave power plants, in which a rising and falling water surface moving in an air compression chamber produces an oscillating air current. The use of this bidirectional turbine avoids the need to rectify the air stream by delicate and expensive check valve systems.

Its efficiency is lower than that of a turbine with constant air stream direction and asymmetric airfoil. One reason for the lower efficiency is that symmetric airfoils have a higher drag coefficient than asymmetric ones, even under optimal conditions. Also, in the Wells turbine, the symmetric airfoil runs partly under high angle of attack (i.e., low blade speed / air speed ratio), which occurs during the air velocity maxima of the oscillating flow. A high angle of attack causes a condition known as "stall" in which the airfoil loses lift. The efficiency of the Wells turbine in oscillating flow reaches values between 0.4 and 0.7.

The Wells turbine was developed by Prof. Alan Arthur Wells of Queen's University Belfast in the late 1970s.

== Annotation ==
Another solution of the problem of stream direction independent turbine is the Darrieus wind turbine (Darrieus rotor).

== See also ==
- Siadar Wave Energy Project
- Yoshio Masuda
- Hanna Wave Energy Turbine
- free 3D design to print your own
