= Wave power ship =

A wave-powered ship is a ship, propelled harnessing the energy of the waves.

== Ships ==
=== Constructed boats ===
As yet, there is only one boat that is propelled by wave harnessing fins:

- Suntory Mermaid II

Mermaid II uses a passive fin mechanism mounted at the bow. A combination of fins and springs capture wave energy, then release it as a propelling drive forwards.

=== Ship concepts ===
1. Ship concepts having wave harnessing fins like the "Suntory Mermaid, described above:

- E/S Orcelle A conceptual design for a large car ferry has been projected. This is planned to use wave energy as a minor component of its energy supply, the major source of which is hydrogen fuel.

2. Ships with several hulls, that are movable among one another:

- The "Oeko-Trimaran" Using the principles of the stationary "Pelamis wave power" plants to produce hydrogen fuel by wave energy. Also sun and wind (Wind turbine) energy are used for fuel production, which work also during the mooring times of the ship.

== See also ==
- Hydrogen-powered ship
- Marine current power
- Marine propulsion
- Wave power
- Windmill ship
- Wind-powered vehicle
