= Seabased =

Wave power technology developer

Seabased is a developer of wave power technology, originally based in Sweden and now headquartered in Dublin, Ireland.

Multiple devices have been tested in Sweden and Norway, and a wave farm is being constructed in Ghana, although this project has experienced delays. The company has announced ambitious plans for many projects, although few of these have yet come to fruition.

Seabased is working with the United Nations on developing a regulatory framework for deploying wave energy in Small Island Developing States, including Bermuda, to help them transition away from fossil fuel power.

== Device concept ==
The device concept has a buoy floating on the surface, which is tethered via a steel cable to a seabed-mounted device containing a three-phase direct-drive (i.e without gearbox) linear generator. It is classified as an offshore point-absorber type wave energy converter (WEC), and it works primarily in heave (up-and-down motion). Key properties of the deployed WECs and their generators are given below, with rated power at a stroke speed of 0.7 metres per second (2.3 ft/s).

Main characteristics of deployed generators
Deployed at	Generator	Translator mass	Magnet type	Hull height	Rated power
Islandsberg & Runde	3-phase 4-pole	1.2 tonnes	Nd_{2}Fe_{14}B	8.65 metres (28.4 ft)	10 kW
Sotenäs & Ada Foah	3-phase 9-pole	9.8 tonnes	Ferite	6.0 metres (19.7 ft)	30 kW

== History ==
The WEC concept was originally developed at Uppsala University, it was originally commercialised by the Swedish spin-out company Seabased Industry AB (SIAB). Seabased demonstrated the technology at several locations between 2006 and 2016.

Early tests were conducted at the Islandsberg Test Site at Lysekil on the west coast of Sweden, about 100 kilometres (62 mi) north of Gothenburg. The water depth at the site is about 25 metres (82 ft), located at 34°11.74′N 11°22.44′E. A total of 12 WECs were tested between March 2006 and August 2009.

=== Runde, Norway ===
In September 2009, two Seabased WECs and an underwater substation were installed off the coast of Runde, Norway, at the MAREN test site of the Runde Environmental Centre. The project was in partnership with Vattenfall, and was connected to the local 22 kV electricity grid. The devices were located about 400 metres (1,300 ft) to the west of the island of Runde, in water depths of 45 to 90 metres (148 to 295 ft) at 62°23′18″N 5°35′32″E. There were technical problems with the devices, and they were removed in 2013.

=== Sotenäs, Sweden ===
An array of 36 Seabased WECs totalling 1 MW and a subsea substation was installed off the coast of Kungshamn, Sotenäs in June 2014, at about 50 m water depth. The devices were connected to the Swedish electricity grid in 2015, via a 10 kilometres (6 mi) subsea cable. The project was started in November 2011 and there were plans to deploy a further 9 MW at the site, however the project ended by 2018 as funding ran out. The generators are still in-situ as an artificial reef.

=== Ada Foah Energy Project, Ghana ===
Seabased and TC's Energy are developing a wave farm in the Gulf of Guinea, about 17 kilometres (11 mi) off the coast of Ada Foah in Ghana. In 2014, a power purchase agreement was signed to provide 1,000 MW of electricity to the Electricity Company of Ghana.

The first phase of the project was in installed in 2015 with the onshore switchgear connecting the first phase of wave energy converters to the local grid.

In March 2018, a power purchase agreement was signed with TC's Energy for a 100 MW project. However, the project stalled.

In 2020, plans were announced to revive the project, with finance from Power China covering 85% of the project cost, the remaining 15% bourne by TC's Energy Ghana.

== Future plans ==
Various announcements have been made by Seabased to develop wave farms (or wave parks) in various locations around the world. In 2018, CEO Oivind Magnussen acknowledged in an interview with Forbes that this could be "difficult".

- In June 2024, Seabased announced a memorandum of understanding with the Barbados Investment and Development Corporation, to develop a pilot wave farm in Barbados. The initial plans are for 2 MW, and used to support the production of green hydrogen, however this could be expanded to 10 MW or more in future.
- In 2023, plans to develop a 40 MW wave park in Bermuda progressed with the introduction of a "regulatory sandbox" making it easier to install innovative technologies. The project has been mooted since 2018.
- In May 2018, a 5 MW pilot park in Gran Canaria was announced, to provide electricity for desalination.
- Also in 2018, Seabased started developing plans to install a 10 MW wave park in Tonga.
- In 2015, Seabased had signed a memorandum of understanding to develop wave energy in Andaman Islands, India.
