= Cyclotron Road =

Fellowship program for technology

Cyclotron Road is a fellowship program for technology innovators at Lawrence Berkeley National Laboratory, or Berkeley Lab. Cyclotron Road supports entrepreneurial scientists as they advance their own technology projects that have the promise of significant global impact. The core support for the program comes from the Department of Energy's Office of Energy Efficiency and Renewable Energy, through the Lab-Embedded Entrepreneurship Program. Most of the technologies developed by Cyclotron Road fellows are designed to accelerate the transition to a decarbonized economy.

Berkeley Lab manages the program in close partnership with Activate, a nonprofit organization established to scale the Cyclotron Road fellowship model to a greater number of innovators around the U.S. and the world. The Activate website describes this connection explicitly: "Activate’s entrepreneurial fellowship model originated at Cyclotron Road, a division of Lawrence Berkeley National Laboratory and founding Activate partner." Activate Fellows have founded companies have raised more $1.3 billion in follow-on funding and created more than 1200 jobs.

== Notable alumni and their companies ==
The following table lists some notable alumni from the first four cohorts who are now in leadership positions, usually with the companies that they founded or co-founded.

Name and Cohort	Technology Sector	Position & company	Recent News
2015 Cohort
Etosha Cave & Kendra Kuhl	Carbon transformation	CSO & CTO, Twelve	Chan Zuckerberg Initiative
Raymond Weitekamp	Additive manufacturing	CEO, polySpectra	Additive Manufacturing
Deepak Dugar	Biomanufacturing	CEO, Visolis	Forbes
Marcus Lehmann	Renewable Energy	CEO, CalWave	Forbes
2016 Cohort
Richard Wang	Energy storage	CEO, Cuberg	Reuters
Peter Frischmann	Energy storage	CEO, Sepion	C&EN
Andrew Hsieh	Energy storage	CEO, Liminal	Automotive News
Colin Bailie & Chris Eberspacher	Photovoltaics	CEO & Director, Tandem PV	Bay Area Business Journal
2017 Cohort
Sarah Richardson	Biotechnology	CEO, MicroByre	C&EN
David Bierman	Energy storage	CPO, Antora Energy	CNBC, Canary Media
Lance Brockway & Dave Walther	Metamaterials	CTO & President, Nelumbo	Cooling Post
Vince Romanin	Air conditioning	CEO, Gradient	Wired
2018 Cohort
Tim Latimer & Jack Norbeck	Geothermal	CEO & CTO, Fervo Energy	New York Times, Washington Post
Andrew Ponec & Justin Briggs	Energy storage	CEO & COO, Antora Energy	CNBC, Canary Media
Christopher Graves	Energy storage	CEO, Noon Energy	Canary Media
Jill Fuss	Technology entrepreneurship	Managing Director, Activate Berkeley	Cision
