= Swedish Energy Agency =

- Energimyndigheten

Agency overview
- Formed: 1 July 1998
- Jurisdiction: Government of Sweden
- Headquarters: Eskilstuna, Sweden
- Employees: approximately 450 (2023)
- Annual budget: SEK 2.4 billion (2023)
- Agency executive: Caroline Asserup (Director General)
- Parent department: Ministry of Climate and Enterprise
- Website: www.energimyndigheten.se/en

Swedish Energy Agency (Energimyndigheten in Swedish) is a government agency in Sweden responsible for the nation's energy systems, energy efficiency, and energy research. It supports the country's transition to a sustainable and secure energy system, promotes renewable energy, and coordinates Sweden's energy preparedness.

== History ==
The Swedish Energy Agency was established in 1998 following the transfer of responsibilities from NUTEK (the Swedish National Board for Industrial and Technical Development, now defunct). The agency has approximately 435 employees and is headquartered in Eskilstuna. Director-General since 15 August 2025 is Caroline Asserup.

== Responsibilities ==
The Swedish Energy Agency has a mandate that includes:

- Energy systems and market analysis: monitoring electricity, oil, gas, and biofuel markets and publishing regular reports.
- Energy preparedness: enhancing societal readiness and supporting regional and municipal planning for future electricity demand.
- Funding and innovation: administering grants and calls for projects.
- Energy research and R&D coordination: establishing and supporting energy-related research centres to boost Sweden's position in global energy research.
- Policy implementation and EU coordination: acting as the national coordinator for EU directives such as the Energy Efficiency Directive, including facilitating data center energy performance reporting under EU regulations.
- Supporting innovation and the energy transition through funding calls covering electrification, sustainable fuels, and urban transformation projects.

== See also ==
- Finnish Energy Authority, the Finnish counterpart.
