= Swedish Companies Registration Office =

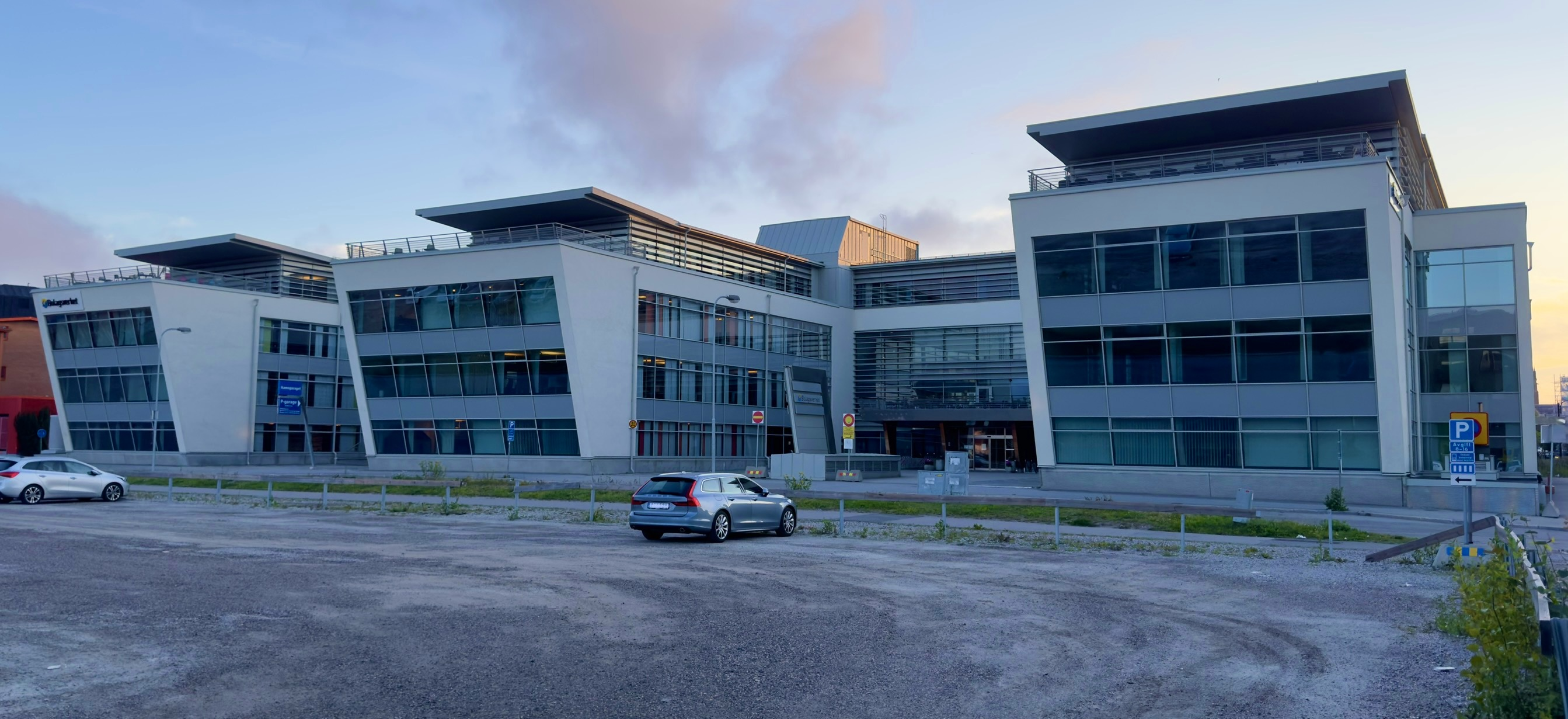
The Bolagsverket offices in Sundsvall

Swedish Companies Registration Office (Swedish: Bolagsverket), is a Swedish government agency which mainly handles the registration of new companies and registry changes for existing businesses, such as change of address and change of board of directors and auditors. The Agency receives financial statements and records of chattel mortgages and liquidations. The agency also provides corporate information (registers information about Swedish companies and associations) and is appointed by the Government to be the development agency for e-government in the area of business and enterprise.

The Swedish Companies Registration Office was formed in 2004. Its headquarters is located in Sundsvall, where it employs about 500 employees. It is assigned to the Ministry of Enterprise and Innovation.
