= Alan Arthur Wells =

British structural engineer (1924-2005)

Alan Arthur Wells (1 May 1924 – 8 November 2005) was a British structural engineer.

== Early life ==
He was born in Goff's Oak, Hertfordshire to Arthur John Wells, a British Oxygen Company engineer and educated at the City of London School as a day boy. He left school in 1940 to become an apprentice fitter and studied for a London University external degree via day release and weekend classes. He was awarded an intermediate B.Sc. in 1941 at the age of 17. After two years at Nottingham University College he was awarded an honours degree in Engineering, 2nd Class.

He had married Rosemary Mitchell in June 1950.

In 1964 he proposed a rail tunnel between Scotland and Northern Ireland, and later invented the Wells turbine which bears his name.

== Honours and awards ==
- 1942 Bayliss Prize, Institution of Civil Engineers
- 1946 Miller Prize, Institution of Civil Engineers
- 1955 President's Gold Medal, Society of Engineers
- 1956 Premium Award, Royal Institution of Naval Architects
- 1964 Houdremont Lecture, International Institute of Welding
- 1966 Hadfield Medal, Iron and Steel Institute
- 1968 Larke Medal, Institute of Welding
- 1969 Honorary Fellow, Institute of Welding
- 1973 Honorary Doctorate, Ghent University
- 1975 Member, Royal Irish Academy
- 1977 Fellow of the Royal Society of London
- 1979 Fellow, Royal Academy of Engineering
- 1982 Rupert H. Myers Award, University of New South Wales
- 1982 Officer, Order of the British Empire
- 1982 DSc (honoris causa), University of Glasgow
- 1983 Ludwig Tetmajer Award, Technical University of Vienna
- 1984 Freedom of the City of London
- 1986 DSc (honoris causa), Queen's University Belfast
- 1986 Platinum Medal, Institute of Metals
- 1987 Edstrom Medal, International Institute of Welding
- 1994 The Esso Medal, Royal Society
- 1994 Yoshiaki Arata Award, International Institute of Welding
- 1999 Honorary Fellowship, Institution of Mechanical Engineers
- 2003 Named for Professional Members Building and Library at the TWI, Abington
