= Oscillating water column =

Type of wave power generation technology

Oscillating water columns (OWCs) are a type of wave energy converter that harness energy from the oscillation of the seawater inside a chamber or hollow caused by the action of waves. OWCs have shown promise as a renewable energy source with low environmental impact. Because of this, multiple companies have been working to design increasingly efficient OWC models. OWC are devices with a semi-submerged chamber or hollow open to the sea below, keeping a trapped air pocket above a water column. Waves force the column to act like a piston, moving up and down, forcing the air out of the chamber and back into it. This continuous movement forces a bidirectional stream of high-velocity air, which is channeled through a power take-off (PTO). The PTO system converts the airflow into energy. In models that convert airflow to electricity, the PTO system consists of a bidirectional turbine. This means that the turbine always spins the same direction regardless of the direction of airflow, allowing for energy to be continuously generated. Both the collecting chamber and PTO systems will be explained further under "Basic OWC Components."

== Design ==
=== Basic OWC components ===
==== Power take-off ====
The PTO system is the second main component of an OWC device. It converts the pneumatic power into a desired energy source (i.e. sound or electricity). The PTO system design is very important to the efficiency of the oscillating water column. It must be able to convert airflow going both out of and into the collecting chamber into energy. Turbines that accomplish this are called bidirectional turbines.

===== Wells turbine =====
Figure 1

The Wells turbine, designed in the late 1970s by professor Alan Arthur Wells at Queen's University Belfast, is a bidirectional turbine that uses symmetrical airfoils (see Fig. 1). The airfoils will spin the same direction regardless of the direction of airflow. The Wells turbine has both benefits and drawbacks. It has no moving parts other than the main turbine rotor, making it easier to maintain and more cost effective. However, it sacrifices some efficiency at high airflow rates because the airfoil's high angle of attack creates more drag. The angle of attack is the number of degrees the airfoil is from being parallel with the airflow. Wells turbines are most efficient at low-speed airflows.

===== Hanna turbine =====
The Hanna turbine U.S. patent 8,358,026, was invented by environmental activist John Clark Hanna in 2009. The Hanna turbine was developed to improve upon the pioneering Wells turbine. As with the Wells, the Hanna device has no moving parts that come in direct contact with the ocean. The turbine has two rotors with back-to-back asymmetrical airfoils. Both rotors are mirror images with low angles of attack. The airfoils have higher lift coefficients and less drag than the Wells turbine. This makes the Hanna design less prone to stalling and offers more torque with a larger operating window. The Hanna design also drives two generators that operate outside of the enclosed air duct in a relatively dry environment. This allows for easy maintenance of the generators.

== History ==
The earliest use of oscillating water columns was in whistling buoys. These buoys used the air pressure generated in the collecting chamber to power a PTO system that consisted of a whistle or foghorn. Rather than generating electricity, the PTO would generate sound, allowing the buoy to warn boats of dangerous water. J. M. Courtney patented one of these whistling buoy designs. In 1885 Scientific American reported that 34 of the whistling buoys were operating off the coast of the US.

The next major innovation occurred in 1947 when Yoshio Masuda, a Japanese naval commander, designed an OWC navigation buoy that used a turbine PTO system. The PTO system generated electricity that recharged the buoy's batteries, allowing it to run with little maintenance. This was the first instance of OWCs being used to generate electricity. The buoy had a small output of 70-500 W and was stationed in Osaka Bay.

== Major OWC power plant projects ==
=== LIMPET, Isle of Islay, Scotland ===
Opened in 2001, this OWC power plant generates 500 kW with a single 2.6-meter diameter Wells turbine. The turbine is connected to a collecting chamber made up of 3 connected tubes measuring 6x6 meters. The LIMPET was built into a solid rock coastline of the Isle of Islay. This plant was constructed by Queen's University Belfast in partnership with Wavegen Ireland Ltd.

=== Mutriku, Basque Country ===
Opened in 2011, this OWC power plant can generate approximately 300 kW at proper conditions (enough to power 250 houses) with its 16 Wells turbines. The turbines were provided by Voith, a company which specializes in hydropower technology and manufacturing. The collecting chambers and turbines are housed in a breakwater. Breakwaters are man made walls (built offshore) which block the coastline from wave activity (often used around harbors). Each turbine has its own collecting chamber and the chambers measure 4.5m wide, 3.1m deep and 10m high. This was the first instance of multiple turbines being used in one plant.

=== Ocean Energy (OE) Buoy ===
The OE Buoy, currently under development by OceanEnergy, has been successfully tested in 2006 using a 28-ton 1:4 scale model anchored off the cost of Ireland. The OE Buoy is designed to be anchored far off shore in deep water where storms generate wave activity. It is powered by a Wells turbine and based on a 3-month test, full scale OE Buoys are expected to output approximately 500MW. OE Buoys are assembled on land and then transported by boat to optimal energy locations.

=== MARMOK-A-5 ===
The MARMOK-A-5 is a spar buoy OWC developed by Oceantec and IDOM. It has been tested at the Biscay Marine Energy Platform (BiMEP), near Armintza in the Basque Country, Spain.

== Environmental impact ==
Oscillating water columns have no moving parts in the water, and therefore pose little danger to sea life. Offshore OWCs may even support sea life by creating an artificial reef. The biggest concern is that OWCs cause too much noise pollution, and could damage the natural beauty of a seascape. Both these problems could be fixed by moving OWCs farther off shore.
