= Yoshio Masuda =

Japanese scientist and naval officer

Yoshio Masuda (died 2009) was a Japanese naval commander regarded as the father of modern wave power technology. Among other devices, the oscillating water column is regarded as his invention. It was initially used for small navigation buoys.
