= Ship =

Large watercraft

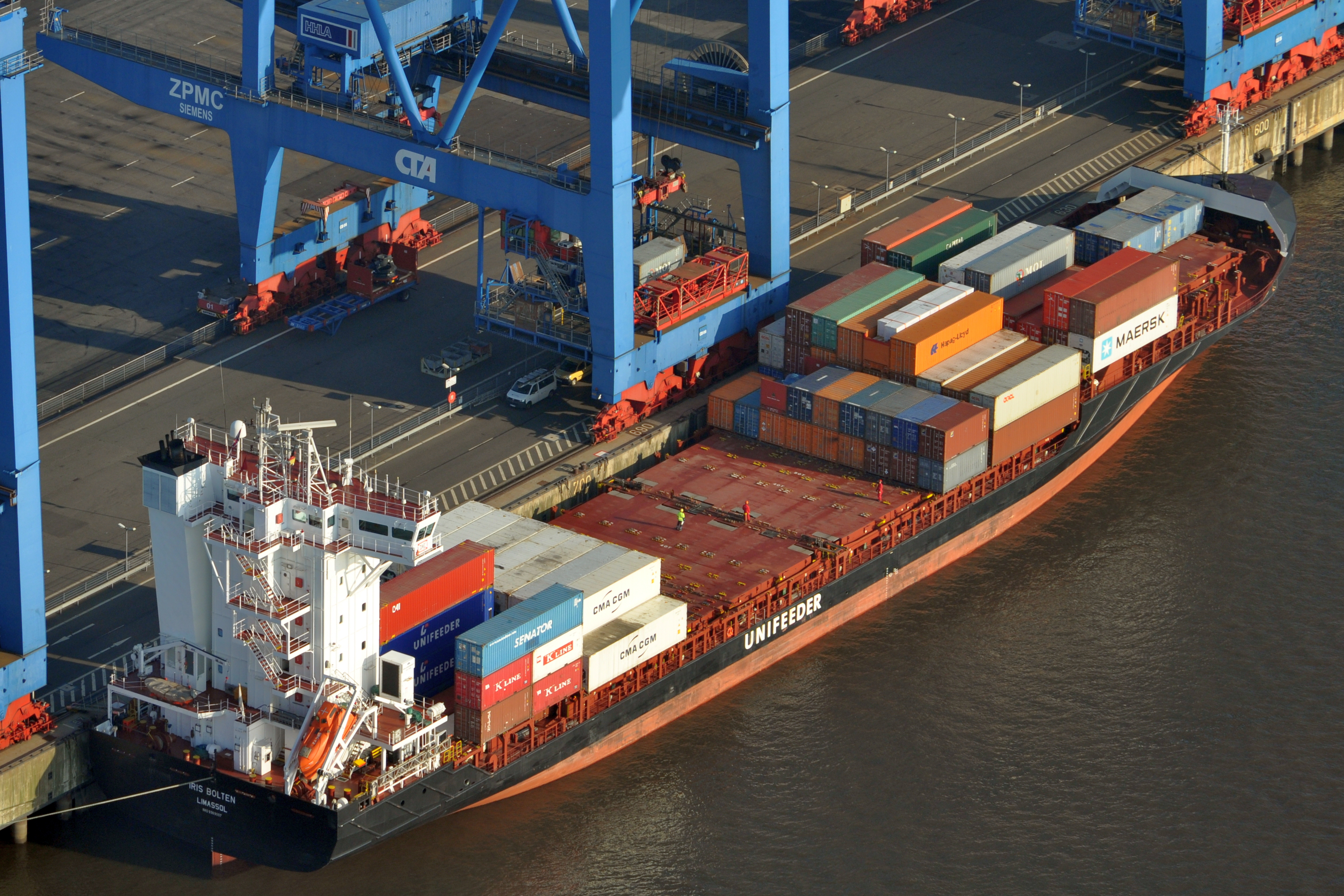
- Feeder ship Iris Bolten at Container Terminal Altenwerder, port of Hamburg, Germany

General characteristics
- Tonnage: Greater than 500 DWT
- Propulsion: steam turbine (fossil fuel, nuclear), diesel, gas turbine, stirling, steam (reciprocating)
- Sail plan: For sailing ships – two or more masts, variety of sail plans

A ship is a large watercraft designed for travel across the surface of a body of water, carrying cargo or passengers, or in support of specialized tasks such as warfare, oceanography and fishing. Ships are generally distinguished from boats, based on size, shape, load capacity and purpose. Ships have supported exploration, trade, warfare, migration, colonization, and science. Ship transport is responsible for the largest portion of world commerce.

The word ship has meant, depending on era and context, either simply a large vessel or specifically a full-rigged ship with three or more masts, each of which is square rigged.

The earliest historical evidence of boats is found in Egypt during the 4th millennium BC. In 2024, ships had a global cargo capacity of 2.4 billion tons, with the three largest classes being ships carrying dry bulk (43%), oil tankers (28%) and container ships (14%).

== Nomenclature ==
Main parts of ship. 1: Funnel; 2: Stern; 3: Propeller and Rudder; 4: Portside (the right side is known as starboard); 5: Anchor; 6: Bulbous bow; 7: Bow; 8: Deck; 9: Superstructure

Ships are typically larger than boats, but there is no universally accepted distinction between the two. Ships generally can remain at sea for longer periods of time than boats. A legal definition of ship from Indian case law is a vessel that carries goods by sea. A common notion is that a ship can carry a boat, but not vice versa. A ship is likely to have a full-time crew assigned. A US Navy rule of thumb is that ships heel towards the outside of a sharp turn, whereas boats heel towards the inside because of the relative location of the center of mass versus the center of buoyancy. American and British 19th century maritime law distinguished "vessels" from other watercraft; ships and boats fall in one legal category, whereas open boats and rafts are not considered vessels.

Starting around the middle of the 18th century, sailing vessels started to be categorised by their type of rig. (Previously they were described by their hull type – for example pink, cat.) Alongside the other rig types such as schooner and brig, (Note: The 1815 Lloyd's Underwriters' Register used 12 different rig types. These were ship, sloop, snow, smack, schooner, schoot, brig, galliot, hoy, dogger, cutter and ketch. Translating these terms into our modern rig names is not necessarily straightforward as some represent something other than the current meaning. The Shipowner's Register of the same date also included barque, lugger and yacht. The barquentine did not come into use until the middle of the 19th century.) the term "ship" referred to the rig type. In this sense, a ship is a vessel with three or more masts, all of which are square-rigged. For clarity, this may be referred to as a full-rigged ship or a vessel may be described as "ship-rigged". (Note: All full-rigged ships have a fore and aft sail on the after-most mast (such as a spanker). In later ships, square sails were set above this, but early in the period the mizzen may carry just a lateen fore-and-aft sail. This would still be categorised as "ship-rigged".) Alongside this rig-specific usage, "ship" continued to have the more general meaning of a large sea-going vessel. Often the meaning can only be determined by context.

Some large vessels are traditionally called boats, notably submarines. Others include Great Lakes freighters, riverboats, and ferryboats, which may be designed for operation on inland or protected coastal waters.

In most maritime traditions ships have individual names, and modern ships may belong to a ship class often named after its first ship.

In many documents the ship name is introduced with a ship prefix being an abbreviation of the ship class, for example "MS" (motor ship) or "SV" (sailing vessel), making it easier to distinguish a ship name from other individual names in a text.

"Ship" (along with "nation") is an English word that has retained a female grammatical gender in some usages, which allows it to sometimes be referred to as a "she" without being of female natural gender. The Imperial War Museum stated that this may have originated from "far more ancient traditions" which included using a female grammatical gender for ships, and that there is a tradition that "relates to the idea of a female figure such as a mother or goddess guiding and protecting a ship and crew." By 2019, the Lloyd's Register of Shipping switched to referring to ships as "it".

== History ==
For most of history, transport by ship – provided there is a feasible route – has generally been cheaper, safer and faster than making the same journey on land. Only the coming of railways in the middle of the 19th century and the growth of commercial aviation in the second half of the 20th century have changed this principle. This applied equally to sea crossings, coastal voyages and use of rivers and lakes.

Examples of the consequences of this include the large grain trade in the Mediterranean during the classical period. Cities such as Rome were totally reliant on the delivery by sailing and human powered (oars) ships of the large amounts of grain needed. It has been estimated that it cost less for a sailing ship of the Roman Empire to carry grain the length of the Mediterranean than to move the same amount 15 miles by road. Rome consumed about 150,000 tons of Egyptian grain each year over the first three centuries AD. (Note: The distance by sea from Alexandria (the main Egyptian grain port during the Roman Empire) to Civitavecchia (the modern port for Rome) is 1,142 nautical miles (2,115 km; 1,314 mi).)

Until recently, it was generally the case that ships were the most advanced representations of the technology available to the societies that produced them.

=== Prehistory and antiquity ===
==== Asian developments ====
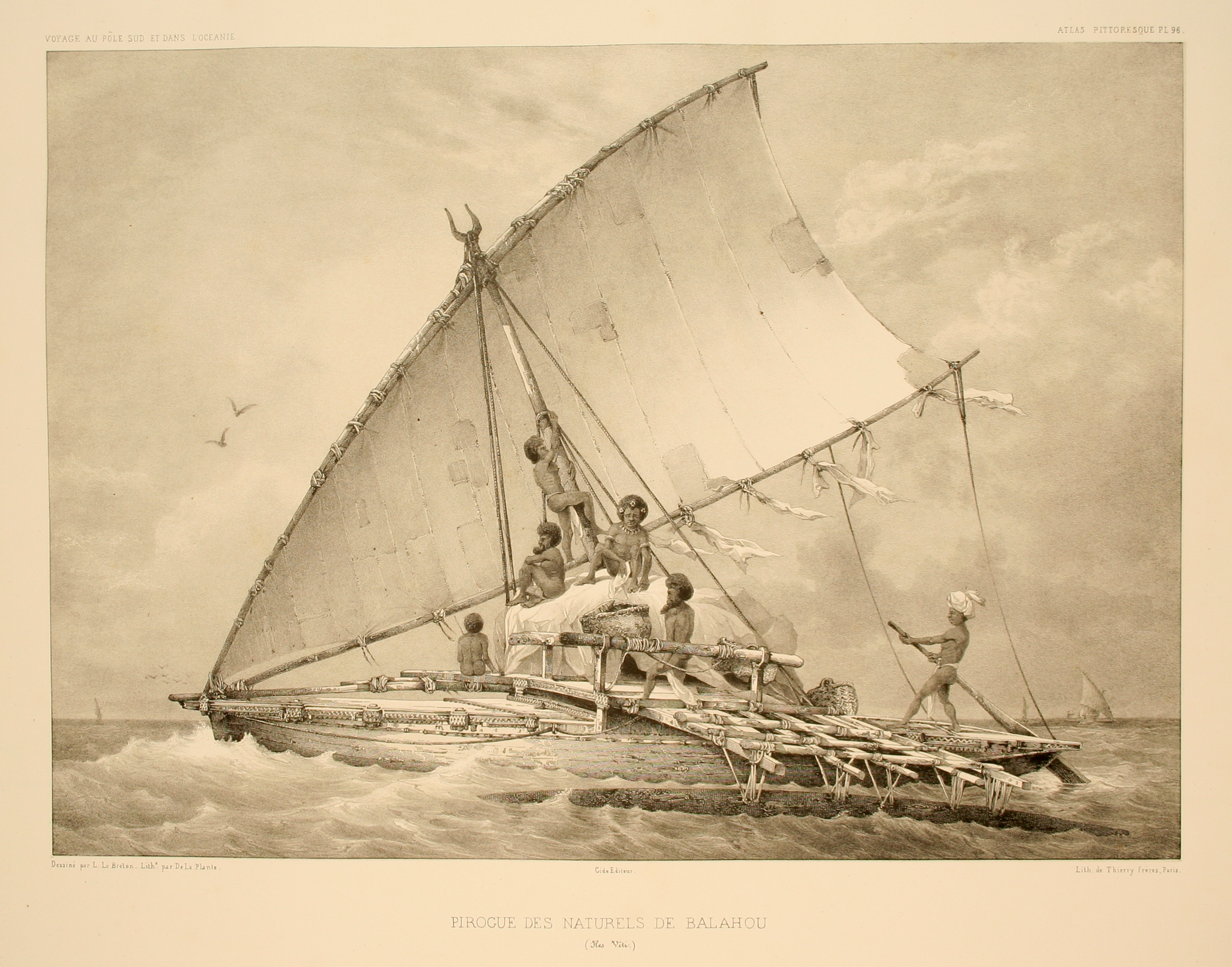
Fijian voyaging outrigger boat with a crab claw sail

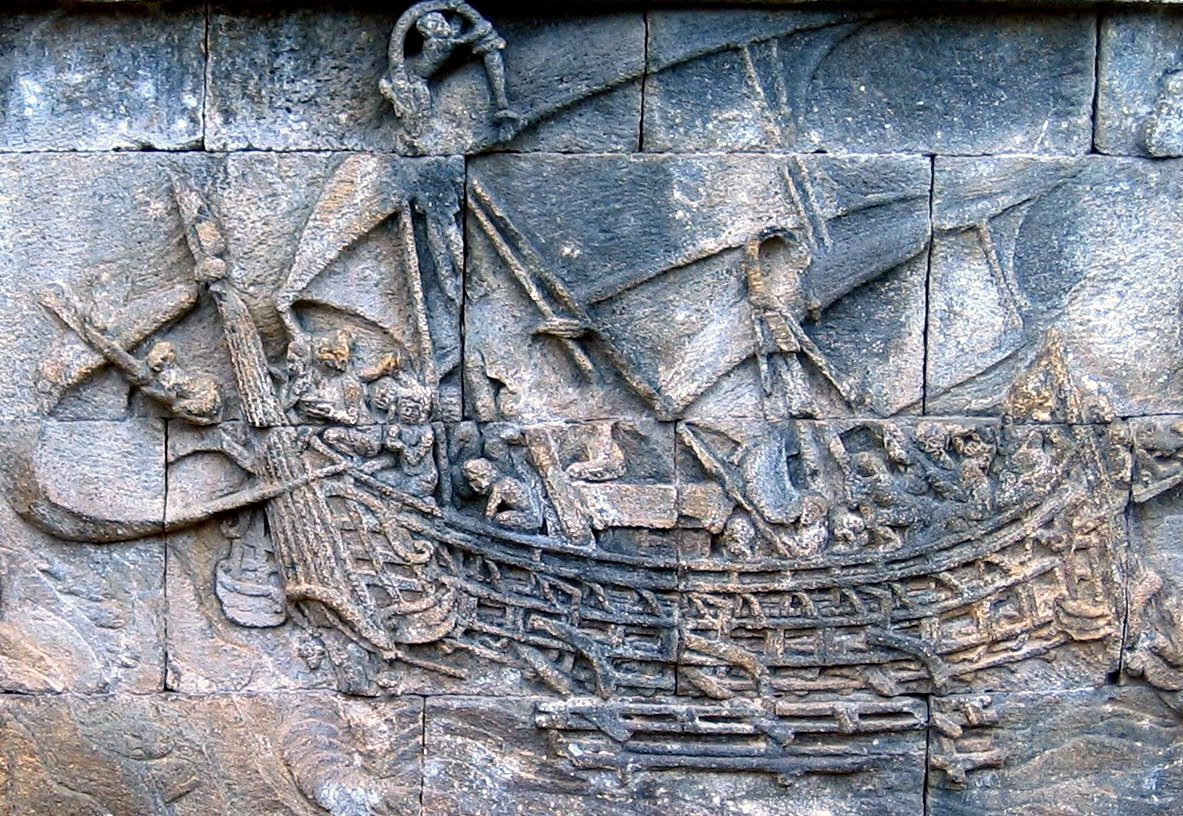
One of the sailing vessels depicted in Borobudur temple, c. 8th century AD in Java, Indonesia

The earliest attestations of ships in maritime transport in Mesopotamia are model ships, which date back to the 4th millennium BC. In archaic texts in Uruk, Sumer, the ideogram for "ship" is attested, but in the inscriptions of the kings of Lagash, ships were first mentioned in connection to maritime trade and naval warfare at around 2500–2350 BC.

Austronesian peoples originated in what is now Taiwan. From here, they took part in the Austronesian Expansion. Their distinctive maritime technology was integral to this movement and included catamarans and outriggers. It has been suggested that they had sails some time before 2000 BC. Their crab claw sails enabled them to sail for vast distances in open ocean. From Taiwan, they rapidly colonized the islands of Maritime Southeast Asia, then sailed further onwards to Micronesia, Island Melanesia, Polynesia, and Madagascar, eventually colonizing a territory spanning half the globe.

Austronesian sails were made from woven leaves, usually from pandan plants. These were complemented by paddlers, who usually positioned themselves on platforms on the outriggers in the larger boats. Austronesian ships ranged in complexity from simple dugout canoes with outriggers or lashed together to large edge-pegged plank-built boats built around a keel made from a dugout canoe. Their designs were unique, evolving from ancient rafts to the characteristic double-hulled, single-outrigger, and double-outrigger designs of Austronesian ships.

In the 2nd century AD, people from the Indonesian archipelago already made large ships measuring over 50 m long and standing 4–7 m out of the water. They could carry 600–1000 people and 250–1000 ton cargo. These ships were known as kunlun bo or k'unlun po (崑崙舶, lit. "ship of the Kunlun people") by the Chinese, and kolandiaphonta by the Greeks. They had 4–7 masts and were able to sail against the wind due to the usage of tanja sails. These ships may have reached as far as Ghana. In the 11th century, a new type of ship called djong or jong was recorded in Java and Bali. This type of ship was built using wooden dowels and treenails, unlike the kunlun bo which used vegetal fibres for lashings.

In China, miniature models of ships that feature steering oars have been dated to the Warring States period (c. 475–221 BC). By the Han dynasty, a well kept naval fleet was an integral part of the military. Centre-line rudders, mounted at the stern, started to appear on Chinese ship models starting in the 1st century AD. (Note: The Chinese rudder has some substantial differences from the pintle and gudgeon-hung rudder that was adopted from Northern Europe into the Mediterranean some time after the middle of the 12th century. Chinese ships of this time did not even have a stern post on which to mount a rudder. Elsewhere, Arab shipwrights used a stern-post mounted rudder which would have been known to Mediterranean mariners before their adoption of the pintle and gudgeon system, but the Arab system used rope lashings between the sternpost and the rudder, not the metal of the Northern European system. The Arab system had no significant adoption in the Mediterranean and had the disadvantage of needing frequent inspection.) However, these early Chinese ships were fluvial (riverine), and were not seaworthy. The Chinese only acquired sea-going ship technologies in the 10th-century AD Song dynasty after contact with Southeast Asian k'un-lun po trading ships, leading to the development of the junks.

==== Mediterranean developments ====
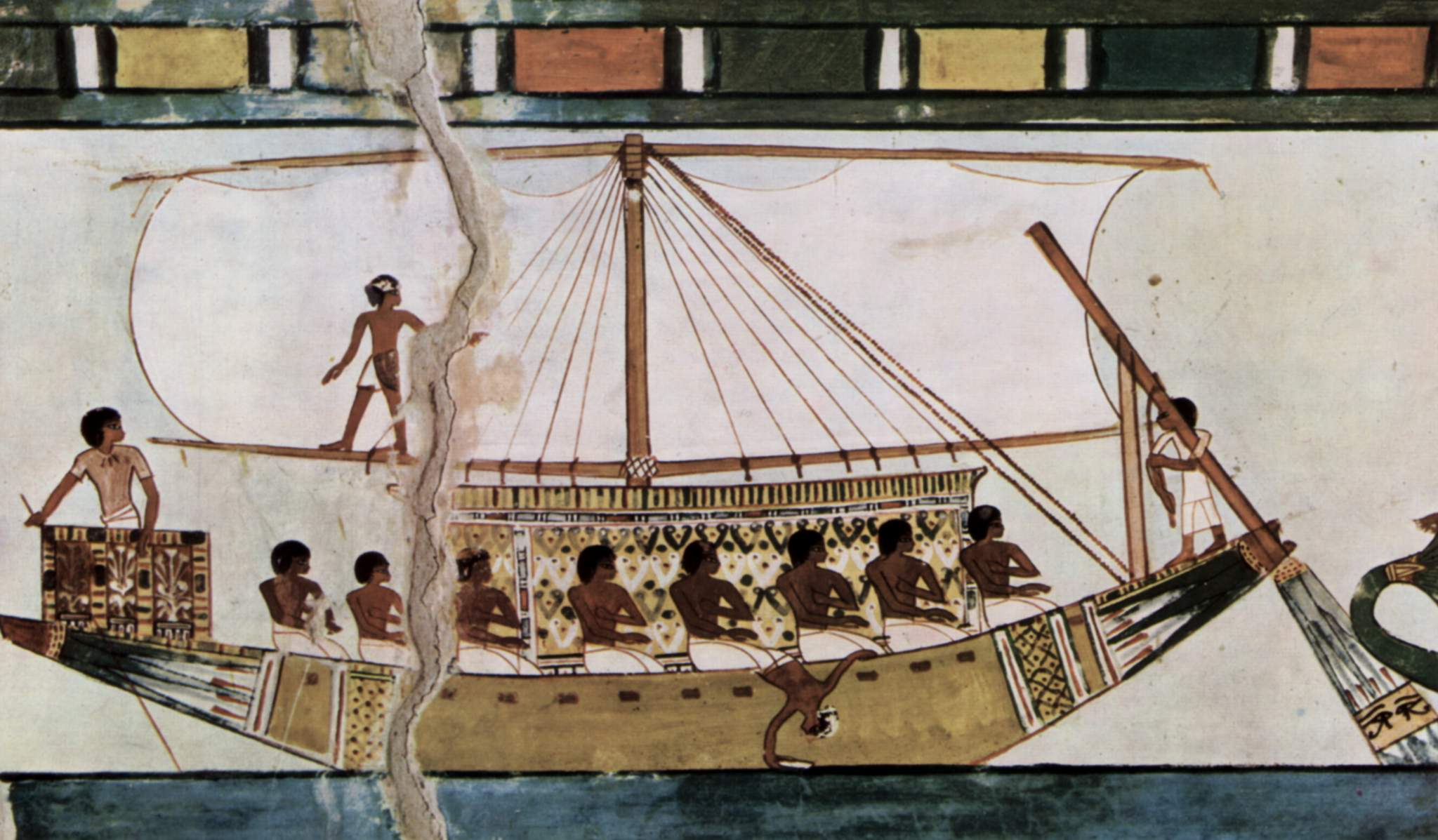
Egyptian sailing ship, c. 1422–1411 BC

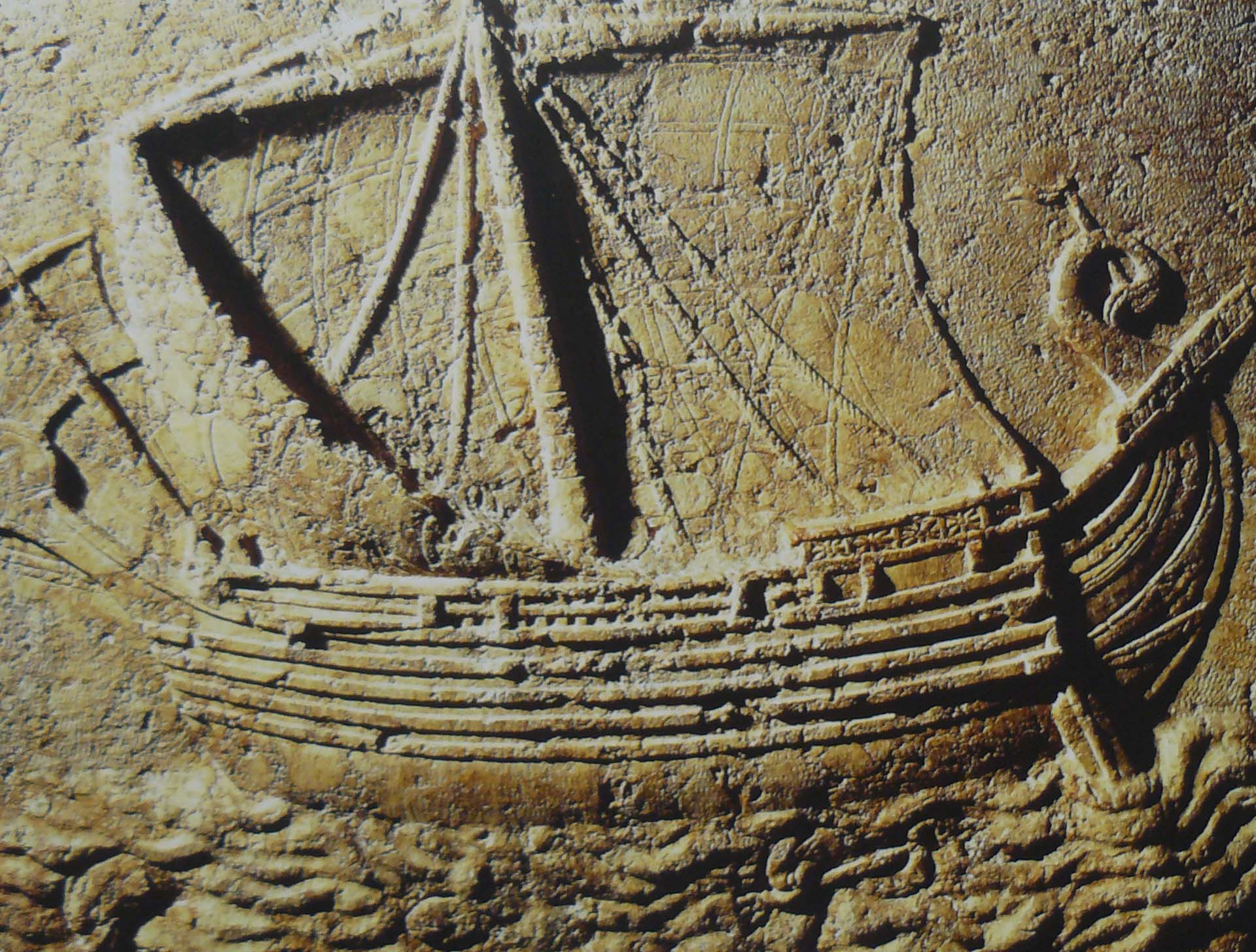
A Roman ship carved on the face of the "Ship Sarcophagus", c. 2nd century AD

The earliest historical evidence of boats is found in Egypt during the 4th millennium BC The Greek historian and geographer Agatharchides had documented ship-faring among the early Egyptians: "During the prosperous period of the Old Kingdom, between the 30th and 25th centuries BC, the river-routes were kept in order, and Egyptian ships sailed the Red Sea as far as the myrrh-country."

The ancient Egyptians were perfectly at ease building sailboats. A remarkable example of their shipbuilding skills was the Khufu ship, a vessel 143 feet (44 m) in length entombed at the foot of the Great Pyramid of Giza around 2500 BC and found intact in 1954.

The oldest discovered sea faring hulled boat is the Late Bronze Age Uluburun shipwreck off the coast of Turkey, dating back to 1300 BC.

By 1200 BC, the Phoenicians were building large merchant ships. In world maritime history, declares Richard Woodman, they are recognized as "the first true seafarers, founding the art of pilotage, cabotage, and navigation" and the architects of "the first true ship, built of planks, capable of carrying a deadweight cargo and being sailed and steered."

=== Medieval and early modern periods ===
==== Asian developments ====
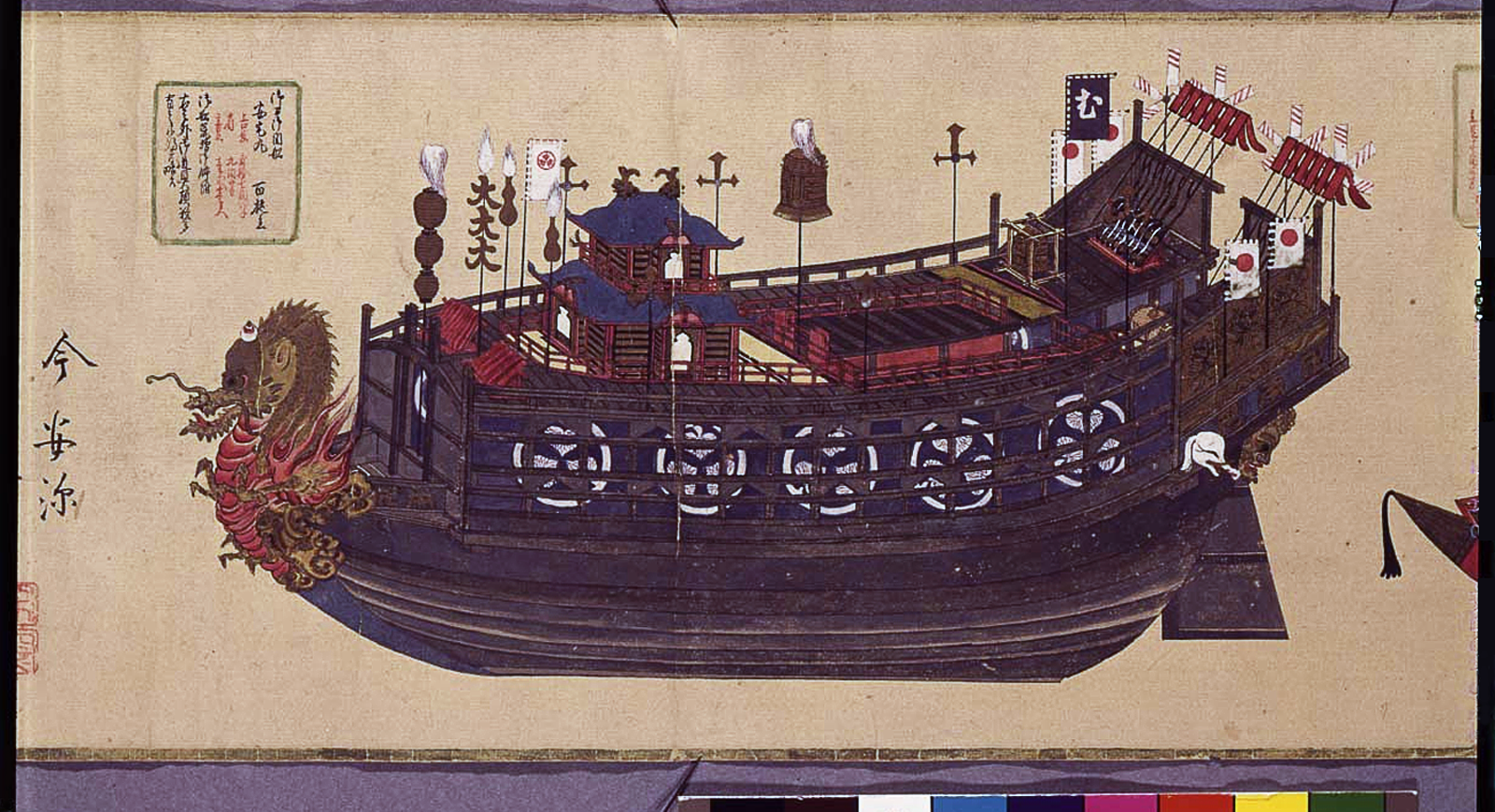
A Japanese atakebune from the 16th century

During the 15th century, China's Ming dynasty assembled one of the largest and most powerful naval fleets in the world for the diplomatic and power projection voyages of Zheng He. Elsewhere in Japan in the 15th century, one of the world's first iron-clads, "Tekkōsen" (鉄甲船), literally meaning "iron ships", was also developed. In Japan, during the Sengoku era from the 15th century to 17th century, the great struggle for feudal supremacy was fought, in part, by coastal fleets of several hundred boats, including the atakebune. In Korea, in the early 15th century during the Joseon era, "Geobukseon"(거북선), was developed.

The empire of Majapahit used large ships called jong, built in northern Java, for transporting troops overseas. The jongs were transport ships which could carry 100–2000 tons of cargo and 50–1000 people, 28.99–88.56 meter in length. The exact number of jong fielded by Majapahit is unknown, but the largest number of jong deployed in an expedition is about 400 jongs, when Majapahit attacked Pasai, in 1350.

==== European developments ====
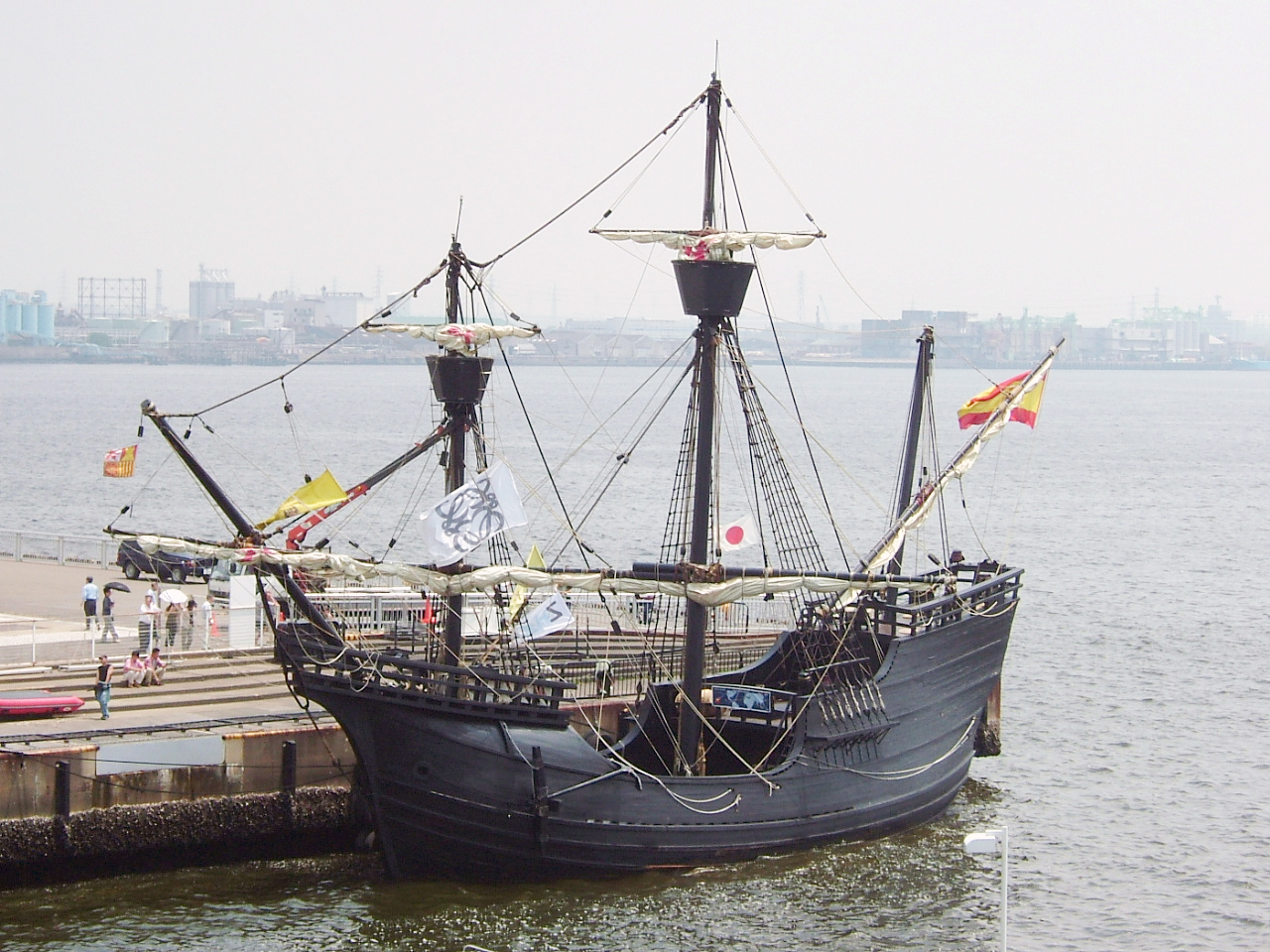
Replica of Magellan's Victoria. Ferdinand Magellan and Juan Sebastián Elcano led the first expedition that circumnavigated the globe in 1519–1522.

Until the late 13th or early 14th century, European shipbuilding had two separate traditions. In Northern Europe (Note: In this context, this Northern European tradition refers to the Atlantic coast of Europe, extending through the North Sea and into the Baltic.) clinker construction predominated. In this, the hull planks are fastened together in an overlapping manner. This is a "shell first" construction technique, with the hull shape being defined by the shaping and fitting of the hull planks. The reinforcing frames (or ribs) are fitted after the planks. Clinker construction in this era usually used planks that were cleft (split radially from the log) and could be made thinner and stronger per unit of thickness than the sawn logs, thanks to preserving the radial integrity of the grain.

An exception to clinker construction in the Northern European tradition is the bottom planking of the cog. Here, the hull planks are not joined to each other and are laid flush (not overlapped). They are held together by fastening to the frames (Note: More technically, these bottom planks were fastened to the floors.) but this is done after the shaping and fitting of these planks. Therefore, this is another case of a "shell first" construction technique. (Note: This less well-known Northern European method may be a continuous tradition going back to the Romano-Celtic period. "Romano-Celtic" is the term given to the shipbuilding tradition found during the Roman occupation of Celtic parts of Europe. This translates to archaeological sites in Britain, arguably including finds in continental Europe. This method certainly continued into the 17th century as the "bottom-based" construction method used in Dutch shipyards.)

These Northern European ships were rigged with a single mast setting a square sail. They were steered by rudders hung on the sternpost.

In contrast, the ship-building tradition of the Mediterranean was of carvel construction – the fitting of the hull planking to the frames of the hull. Depending on the precise detail of this method, it may be characterised as either "frame first" or "frame-led". In either variant, during construction, the hull shape is determined by the frames, not the planking. The hull planks are not fastened to each other, only to the frames.

These Mediterranean ships were rigged with lateen sails on one or more masts (depending on the size of the vessel) and were steered with a side rudder. They are often referred to as "round ships".

Crucially, the Mediterranean and Northern European traditions merged. Cogs (Note: It is possible that the terminology used in the Mediterranean was not precise enough to differentiate between clinker-built ships and cogs, with the same word being applied to both.) are known to have travelled to the Mediterranean in the 12th and 13th centuries. Some aspects of their designs were being copied by Mediterranean ship-builders early in the 14th century. Iconography shows square sails being used on the mainmast but a lateen on the mizzen, (Note: Square sails had disappeared from the Mediterranean after the end of the classical period.) and a sternpost hung rudder replacing the side rudder. The name for this type of vessel was "coche" or, for a larger example, "carrack". Some of these new Mediterranean types travelled to Northern European waters and, in the first two decades of the 15th century, a few were captured by the English, two of which had previously been under charter to the French. The two-masted rig started to be copied immediately, but at this stage on a clinker hull. The adoption of carvel hulls had to wait until sufficient shipwrights with appropriate skills could be hired, but by late in the 1430s, there were instances of carvel ships being built in Northern Europe, and in increasing numbers over the rest of the century.

This hybridisation of Mediterranean and Northern European ship types created the full-rigged ship, a three-masted vessel with a square-rigged foremast and mainmast and a lateen sail on the mizzen. This provided most of the ships used in the Age of Discovery, being able to carry sufficient stores for a long voyage and with a rig suited to the open ocean. Over the next four hundred years, steady evolution and development, from the starting point of the carrack, gave types such as the galleon, fluit, East Indiaman, ordinary cargo ships, warships, clippers and many more, all based on this three-masted square-rigged type.

The transition from clinker to carvel construction facilitated the use of artillery at sea since the internal framing of the hull could be made strong enough to accommodate the weight of guns. It was easier to fit gunports in a carvel hull. As vessels became larger and the demand for ship-building timber affected the size of trees available, clinker construction became limited by the difficulty of finding large enough logs from which to cleave planks. Nonetheless, some clinker vessels approached the size of contemporary carracks. (Note: An example is the Newport medieval ship.) Before the adoption of carvel construction, the increasing size of clinker-built vessels necessitated greater amounts of internal framing of their hulls for strength – something that somewhat lessened the conceptual change to the new technique.

=== 19th and 20th centuries ===
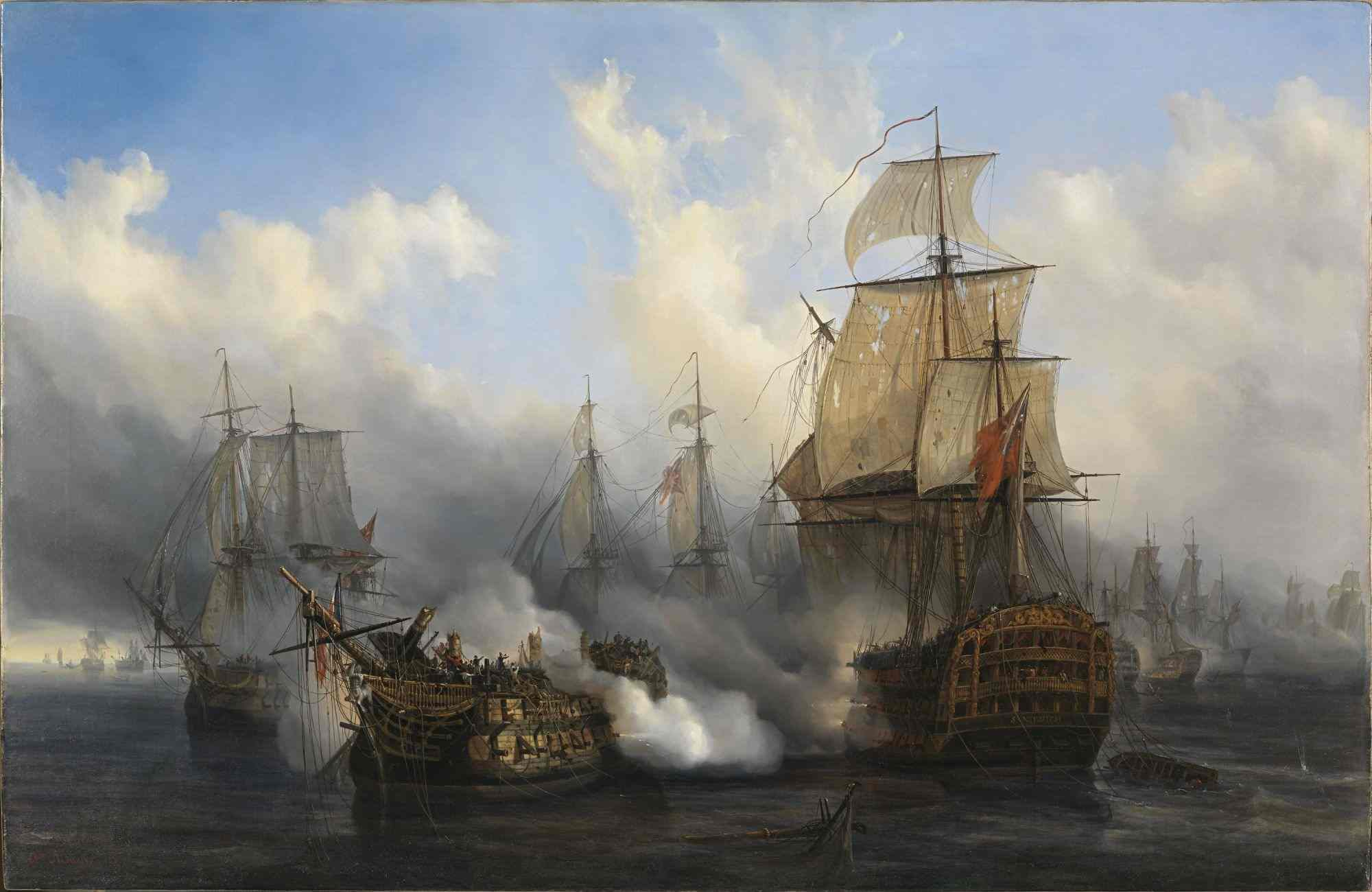
Painting of the Battle of Trafalgar by Auguste Mayer.

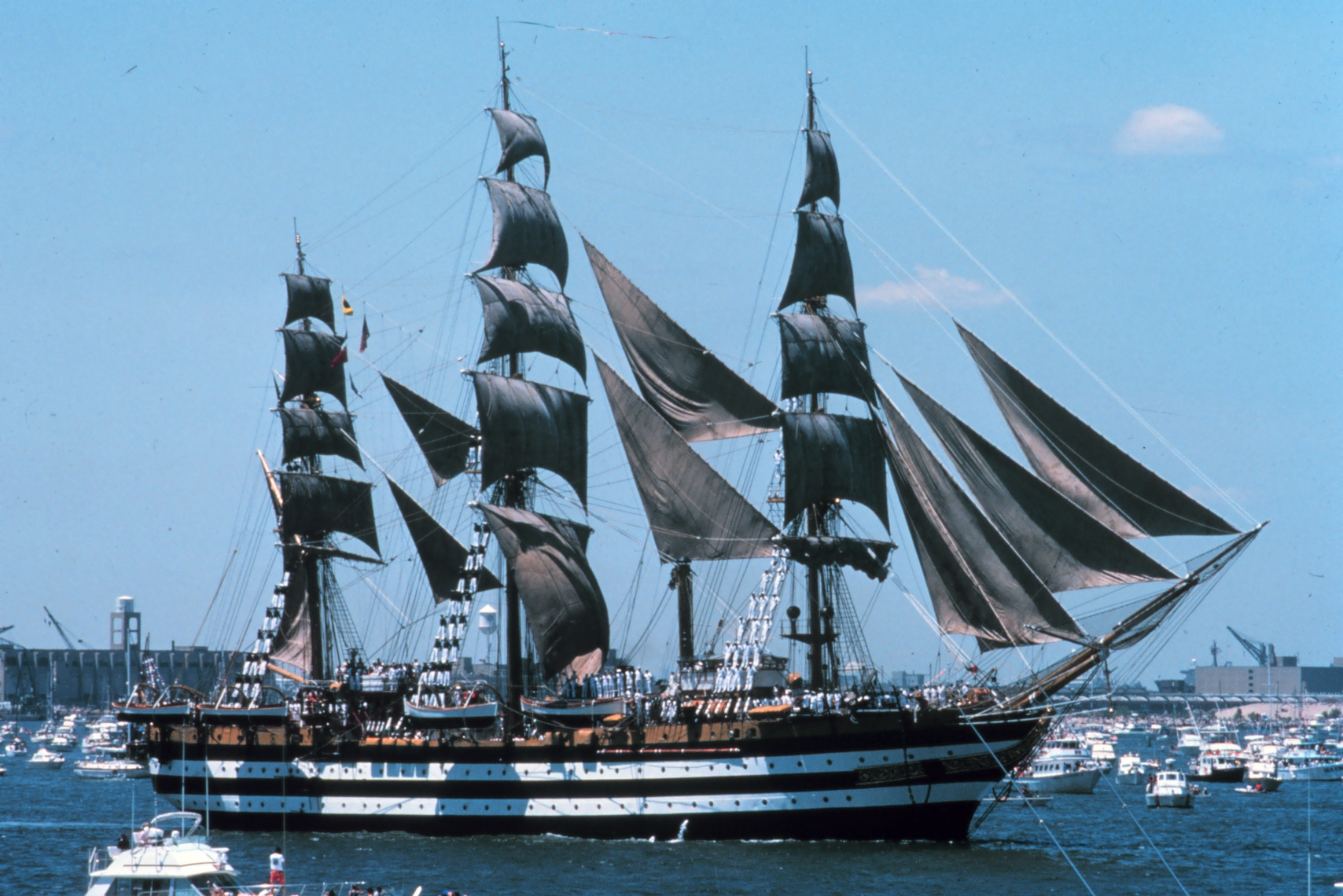
Italian full-rigged ship Amerigo Vespucci in New York Harbor

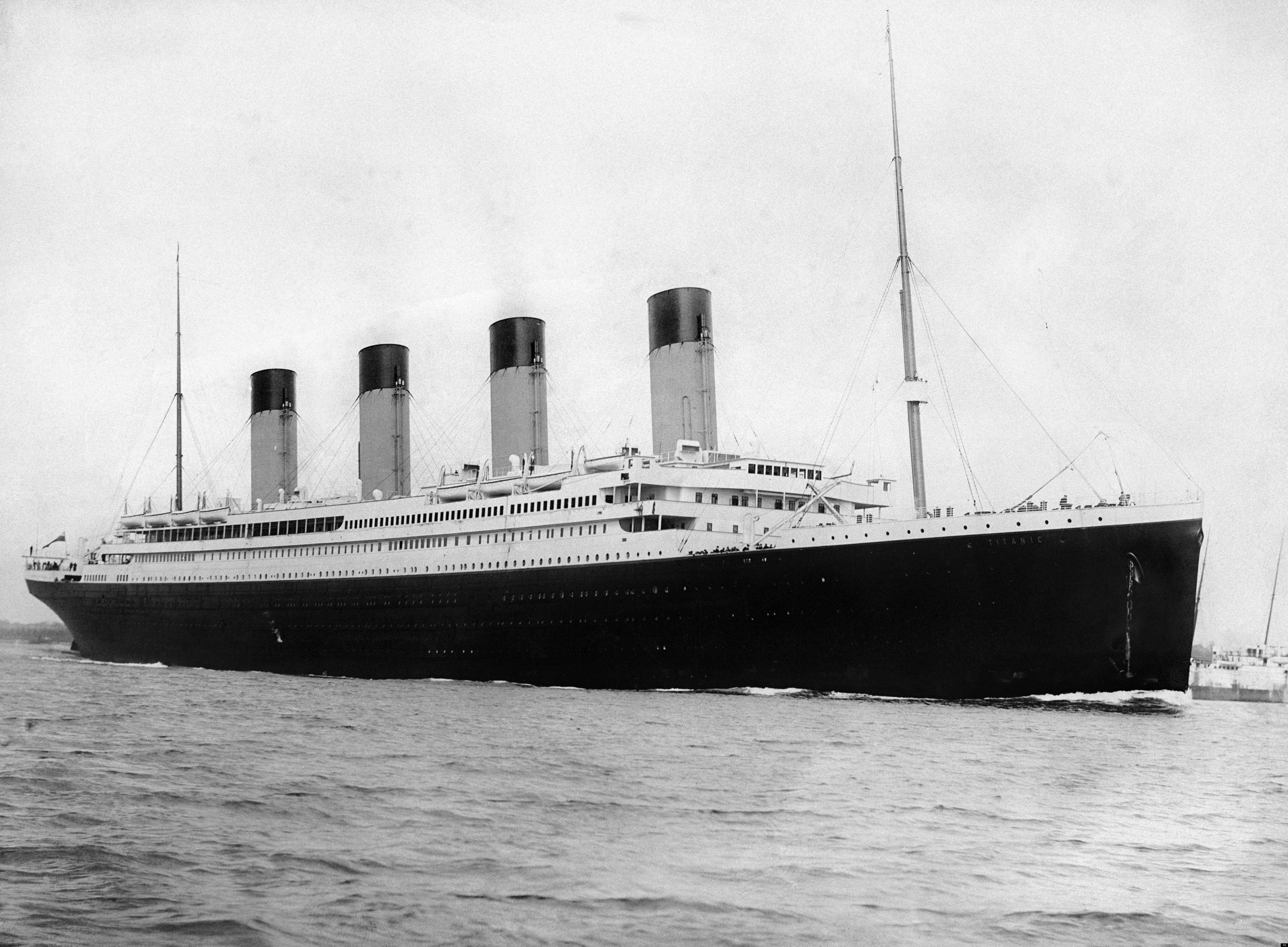
RMS Titanic departs from Southampton. Her sinking led to tighter safety regulations.

Parallel to the development of warships, ships in service of marine fishery and trade also developed in the period between antiquity and the Renaissance.

Maritime trade was driven by the development of shipping companies with significant financial resources. Canal barges, towed by draft animals on an adjacent towpath, contended with the railway up to and past the early days of the Industrial Revolution. Flat-bottomed and flexible scow boats also became widely used for transporting small cargoes. Mercantile trade went hand-in-hand with exploration, self-financed by the commercial benefits of exploration.

During the first half of the 18th century, the French Navy began to develop a new type of vessel known as a ship of the line, featuring seventy-four guns. This type of ship became the backbone of all European fighting fleets. These ships were 56 metres (184 ft) long and their construction required 2,800 oak trees and 40 kilometres (25 mi) of rope; they carried a crew of about 800 sailors and soldiers. During the 19th century the Royal Navy enforced a ban on the slave trade, acted to suppress piracy, and continued to map the world. Ships and their owners grew with the 19th century Industrial Revolution across Europe and North America, leading to increased numbers of oceangoing ships, as well as other coastal and canal based vessels.

Through more than half of the 19th century and into the early years of the 20th century, steam ships coexisted with sailing vessels. Initially, steam was only viable on shorter routes, typically transporting passengers who could afford higher fares, and mail. Steam went through many developmental steps that gave greater fuel efficiency, thereby increasingly making steamships commercially competitive with sail. Screw propulsion worked better than paddle wheels, but relied, among other things, on the invention of an effective stern gland for the propeller shaft. Higher boiler pressures of 60 pounds per square inch (410 kPa) powering compound engines, were introduced in 1865, making long-distance steam cargo vessels commercially viable on the route from England to China – even before the opening of the Suez Canal in 1869. Within a few years, steam had replaced many of the sailing ships that had served this route. Even greater fuel efficiency was obtained with triple-expansion steam engines – but this had to wait for higher quality steel to be available to make boilers running at 125 pounds per square inch (860 kPa) in SS Aberdeen (1881). By this point virtually all routes could be served competitively by steamships. Sail continued with some cargoes, where low costs were more important to the shipper than a predictable and rapid journey time.

The Second Industrial Revolution in particular led to new mechanical methods of propulsion, and the ability to construct ships from metal triggered an explosion in ship design. These led to the development of long-distance commercial ships and Ocean liners, as well as technological changes including the Marine steam engine, screw propellers, triple expansion engines and others. Factors included the quest for more efficient ships, the end of long running and wasteful maritime conflicts, and the increased financial capacity of industrial powers created more specialized ships and other maritime vessels. Ship types built for entirely new functions that appeared by the 20th century included research ships, offshore support vessels (OSVs), Floating production storage and offloading (FPSOs), Pipe and cable laying ships, drill ships and Survey vessels.

The late 20th century saw changes to ships that included the decline of ocean liners as air travel increased. The rise of container ships from the 1960s onwards dramatically changed the nature of commercial merchant shipping, as containerization led to larger ship sizes, dedicated container routes and the decline of general cargo vessels as well as tramp steaming. The late 20th century also saw a rise in cruise ships for tourism around the world.

=== 21st century ===
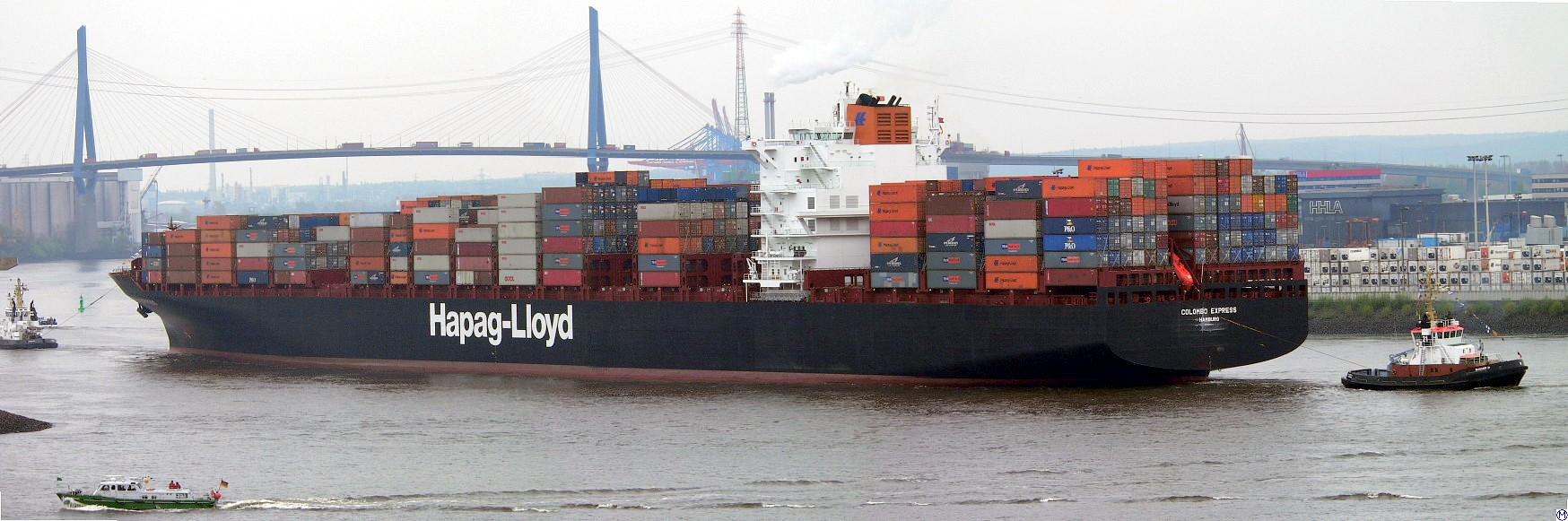
Colombo Express, a 8749 TEU container ship owned and operated by Hapag-Lloyd of Germany

In 2016, there were more than 49,000 merchant ships, totaling almost 1.8 billion deadweight tons. Of these 28% were oil tankers, 43% were bulk carriers, and 13% were container ships. By 2019, the world's fleet included 51,684 commercial vessels with gross tonnage of more than 1,000 tons, totaling 1.96 billion tons. Such ships carried 11 billion tons of cargo in 2018, a sum that grew by 2.7% over the previous year. In terms of tonnage, 29% of ships were tankers, 43% are bulk carriers, 13% container ships and 15% were other types.

In 2008, there were 1,240 warships operating in the world, not counting small vessels such as patrol boats. The United States accounted for 3 million tons worth of these vessels, Russia 1.35 million tons, the United Kingdom 504,660 tons and China 402,830 tons. The 20th century saw many naval engagements during the two world wars, the Cold War, and the rise to power of naval forces of the two blocs. The world's major powers have recently used their naval power in cases such as the United Kingdom in the Falkland Islands and the United States in Iraq.

The size of the world's fishing fleet is more difficult to estimate. The largest of these are counted as commercial vessels, but the smallest are legion. Fishing vessels can be found in most seaside villages in the world. As of 2004, the United Nations Food and Agriculture Organization estimated 4 million fishing vessels were operating worldwide. The same study estimated that the world's 29 million fishermen caught 85,800,000 tonnes (84,400,000 long tons; 94,600,000 short tons) of fish and shellfish that year.

In 2023, the number of ships globally grew by 3.4%. In 2024, new ships are increasingly being built with alternative fuel capability to increase sustainability and reduce carbon emissions. Alternative ship fuels include LNG, LPG, methanol, biofuel, ammonia and hydrogen among others.

As of 2024, wind power for ships had received renewed interest for its potential to mitigate greenhouse gas emissions.

== Types of ships ==
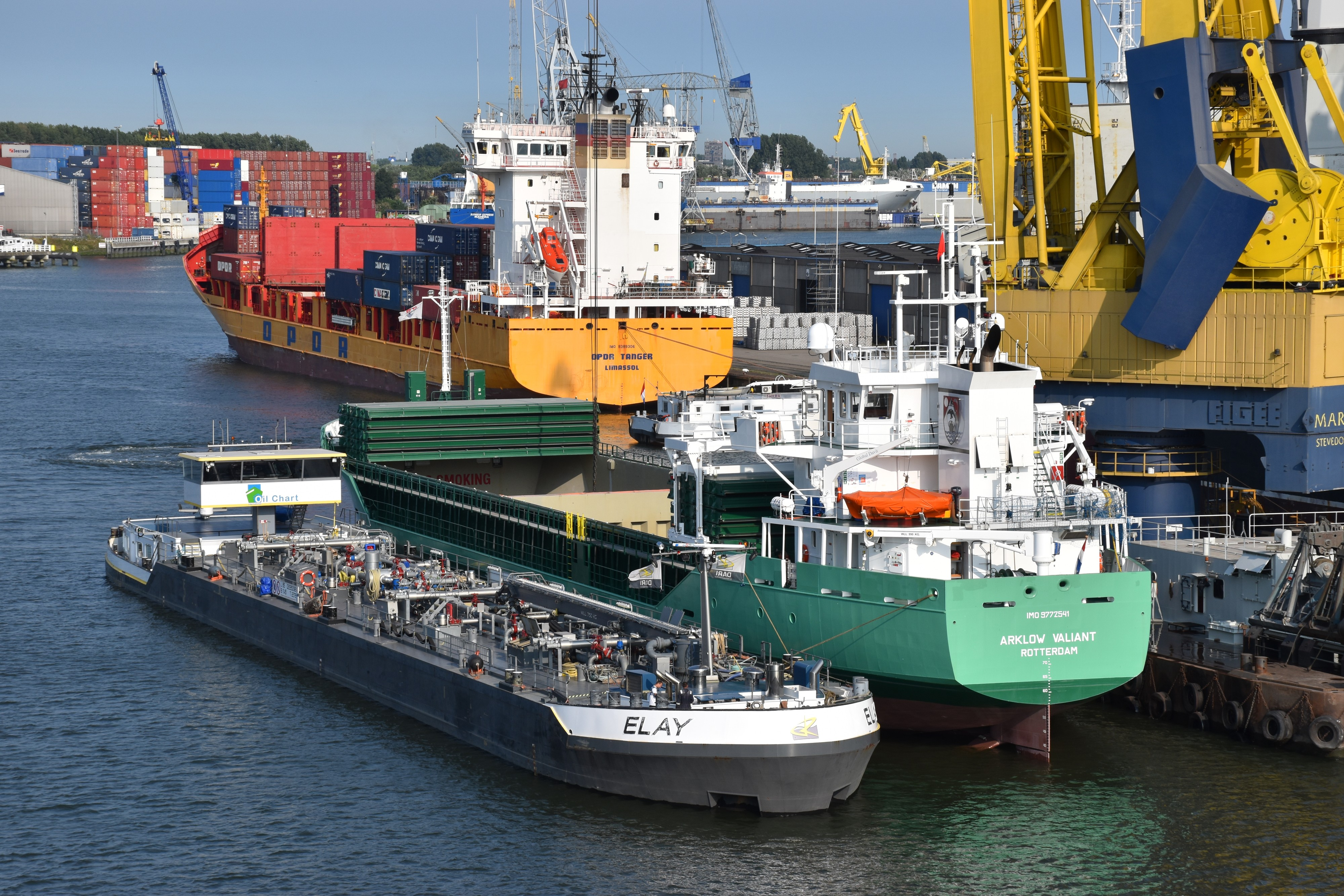
Various vessel types in the Port of Rotterdam

Because ships are constructed using the principles of naval architecture that require same structural components, their classification is based on their function such as that suggested by Paulet and Presles, which requires modification of the components. The categories accepted in general by naval architects are:

- High-speed craft – Multihulls including wave piercers, small-waterplane-area twin hull (SWATH), surface effect ships and hovercraft, hydrofoil, wing in ground effect craft (WIG).
- Off shore oil vessels – Platform supply vessels, pipe layers, accommodation and crane barges, non and semi-submersible drilling rigs, drill ships, production platforms, floating production storage and offloading units.
- Fishing vessels
  - Motorised fishing trawlers, trap setters, seiners, longliners, trollers & factory ships.
  - Traditional sailing and rowed fishing vessels and boats used for handline fishing
- Harbour work craft
  - Cable layers
  - Tugboats, dredgers, salvage vessels, tenders, pilot boats.
  - Floating dry docks, crane vessels, lighterships.
- Dry cargo ships – tramp freighters, bulk carriers, cargo liners, container vessels, barge carriers, Ro-Ro ships, refrigerated cargo ships, timber carriers, livestock carriers & light vehicle carriers.
- Liquid cargo ships – tankers, oil tankers, liquefied gas carriers, LNG carriers, chemical carriers.
- Passenger ships
  - Liners, cruise and special trade passenger (STP) ships
  - Cross-channel, coastal and harbour ferries
  - Luxury and cruising yachts and superyachts
- Sail training and sailing ships
- Galleys – biremes, triremes and quinqueremes
- Recreational boats and craft – rowed, masted and motorised craft
- Special-purpose vessels – weather and research vessels, deep sea survey vessels, and icebreakers.
- Submarines – watercraft capable of independent operation underwater.
- Naval ships
  - Warships – aircraft carriers, amphibious warfare ships, battleships, battlecruisers, coastal defence ships, cruisers, destroyers, frigates, corvettes, patrol ships, minesweepers, etc.
  - Auxiliary ships – ammunition ships, replenishment oilers, repair ships, storeships, troopships, etc.
- Hospital ships

Some of these are discussed in the following sections.

=== Inland vessels ===
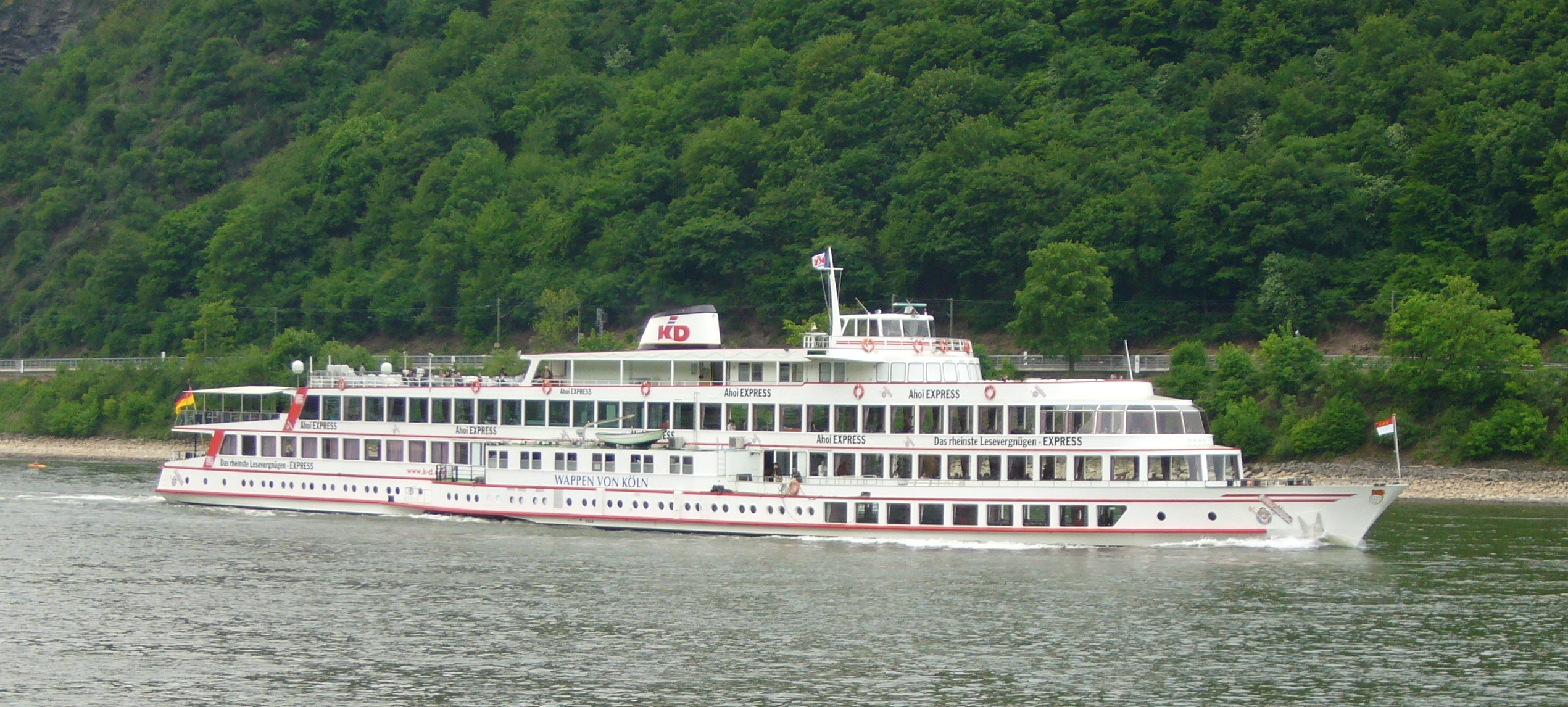
Passenger ship of Köln-Düsseldorfer on the river Rhine

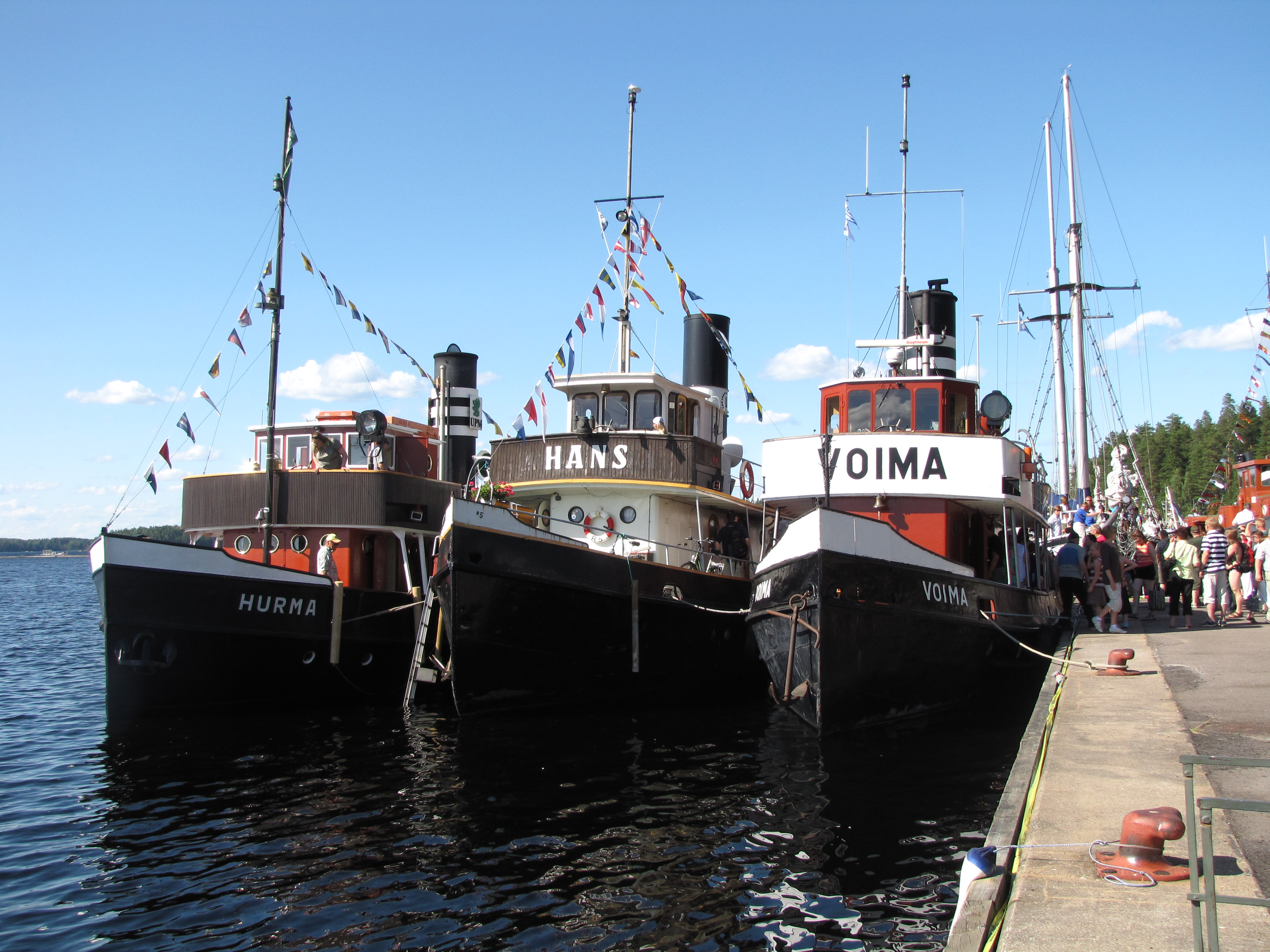
Hurma, Hans and Voima at the Lake Saimaa in the harbour of Imatra, Finland, at a heritage ship meeting in 2009

Freshwater shipping may occur on lakes, rivers and canals. Ships designed for those body of waters may be specially adapted to the widths and depths of specific waterways. Examples of freshwater waterways that are navigable in part by large vessels include the Danube, Mississippi, Rhine, Yangtze and Amazon Rivers, and the Great Lakes.

==== Great Lakes ====
Lake freighters, also called lakers, are cargo vessels that ply the Great Lakes. The most well-known is SS Edmund Fitzgerald, the latest major vessel to be wrecked on the Lakes. These vessels are traditionally called boats, not ships. Visiting ocean-going vessels are called "salties". Because of their additional beam, very large salties are never seen inland of the Saint Lawrence Seaway. Because the smallest of the Soo Locks is larger than any Seaway lock, salties that can pass through the Seaway may travel anywhere in the Great Lakes. Because of their deeper draft, salties may accept partial loads on the Great Lakes, "topping off" when they have exited the Seaway. Similarly, the largest lakers are confined to the Upper Lakes (Superior, Michigan, Huron, Erie) because they are too large to use the Seaway locks, beginning at the Welland Canal that bypasses the Niagara River.

Since the freshwater lakes are less corrosive to ships than the salt water of the oceans, lakers tend to last much longer than ocean freighters. Lakers older than 50 years are not unusual, and as of 2005, all were over 20 years of age.

SS St. Marys Challenger, built in 1906 as William P Snyder, was the oldest laker still working on the Lakes until its conversion into a barge starting in 2013. Similarly, E.M. Ford, built in 1898 as Presque Isle, was sailing the lakes 98 years later in 1996. As of 2007 E.M. Ford was still afloat as a stationary transfer vessel at a riverside cement silo in Saginaw, Michigan.

=== Merchant ship ===
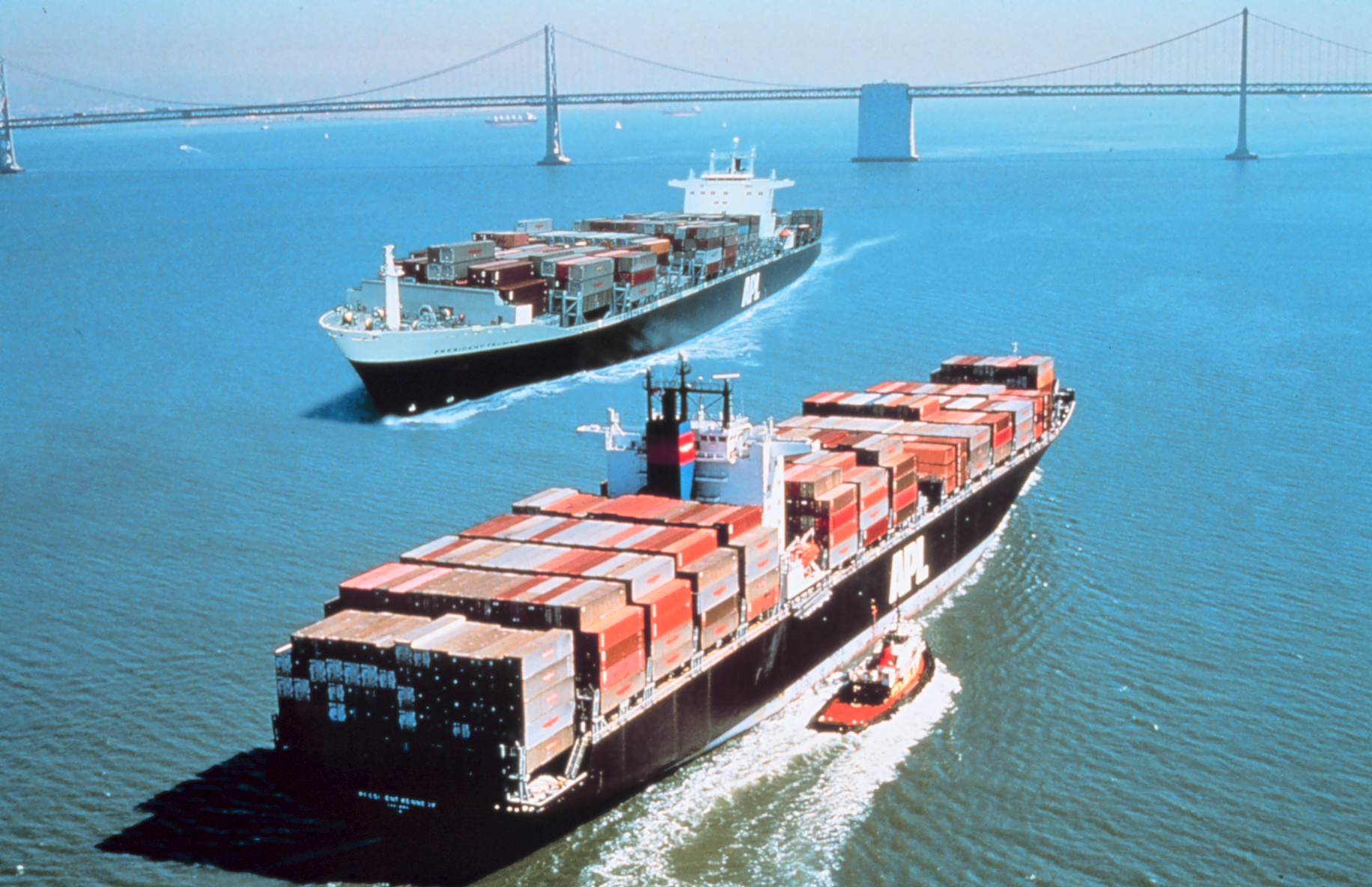
Two modern container ships in San Francisco

Merchant ships are ships used for commercial purposes and can be divided into four broad categories: fishing vessels, cargo ships, passenger ships, and special-purpose ships. The UNCTAD review of maritime transport categorizes ships as: oil tankers, bulk (and combination) carriers, general cargo ships, container ships, and "other ships", which includes "liquefied petroleum gas carriers, liquefied natural gas carriers, parcel (chemical) tankers, specialized tankers, reefers, offshore supply, tugs, dredgers, cruise, ferries, other non-cargo". General cargo ships include "multi-purpose and project vessels and roll-on/roll-off cargo".

Modern commercial vessels are typically powered by a single propeller driven by a diesel or, less usually, gas turbine engine., but until the mid-19th century they were predominantly square sail rigged. The fastest vessels may use pump-jet engines. Most commercial vessels such as container ships, have full hull-forms (higher Block coefficients) to maximize cargo capacity. Merchant ships and fishing vessels are usually made of steel, although aluminum can be used on faster craft, and fiberglass or wood on smaller vessels. Commercial vessels generally have a crew headed by a sea captain, with deck officers and engine officers on larger vessels. Special-purpose vessels often have specialized crew if necessary, for example scientists aboard research vessels.

Fishing boats are generally small, often little more than 30 meters (98 ft) but up to 100 metres (330 ft) for a large tuna or whaling ship. Aboard a fish processing vessel, the catch can be made ready for market and sold more quickly once the ship makes port. Special purpose vessels have special gear. For example, trawlers have winches and arms, stern-trawlers have a rear ramp, and tuna seiners have skiffs. In 2004, 85,800,000 tonnes (84,400,000 long tons; 94,600,000 short tons) of fish were caught in the marine capture fishery. Anchoveta represented the largest single catch at 10,700,000 tonnes (10,500,000 long tons; 11,800,000 short tons). That year, the top ten marine capture species also included Alaska pollock, Blue whiting, Skipjack tuna, Atlantic herring, Chub mackerel, Japanese anchovy, Chilean jack mackerel, Largehead hairtail, and Yellowfin tuna. Other species including salmon, shrimp, lobster, clams, squid and crab, are also commercially fished. Modern commercial fishermen use many methods. One is fishing by nets, such as purse seine, beach seine, lift nets, gillnets, or entangling nets. Another is trawling, including bottom trawl. Hooks and lines are used in methods like long-line fishing and hand-line fishing. Another method is the use of fishing trap.

Cargo ships transport dry and liquid cargo. Dry cargo can be transported in bulk by bulk carriers, packed directly onto a general cargo ship in break-bulk, packed in intermodal containers as aboard a container ship, or driven aboard as in roll-on roll-off ships. Liquid cargo is generally carried in bulk aboard tankers, such as oil tankers which may include both crude and finished products of oil, chemical tankers which may also carry vegetable oils other than chemicals and gas carriers, although smaller shipments may be carried on container ships in tank containers.

Passenger ships range in size from small river ferries to very large cruise ships. This type of vessel includes ferries, which move passengers and vehicles on short trips; ocean liners, which carry passengers from one place to another; and cruise ships, which carry passengers on voyages undertaken for pleasure, visiting several places and with leisure activities on board, often returning them to the port of embarkation. Riverboats and inland ferries are specially designed to carry passengers, cargo, or both in the challenging river environment. Rivers present special hazards to vessels. They usually have varying water flows that alternately lead to high speed water flows or protruding rock hazards. Changing siltation patterns may cause the sudden appearance of shoal waters, and often floating or sunken logs and trees (called snags) can endanger the hulls and propulsion of riverboats. Riverboats are generally of shallow draft, being broad of beam and rather square in plan, with a low freeboard and high topsides. Riverboats can survive with this type of configuration as they do not have to withstand the high winds or large waves that are seen on large lakes, seas, or oceans.

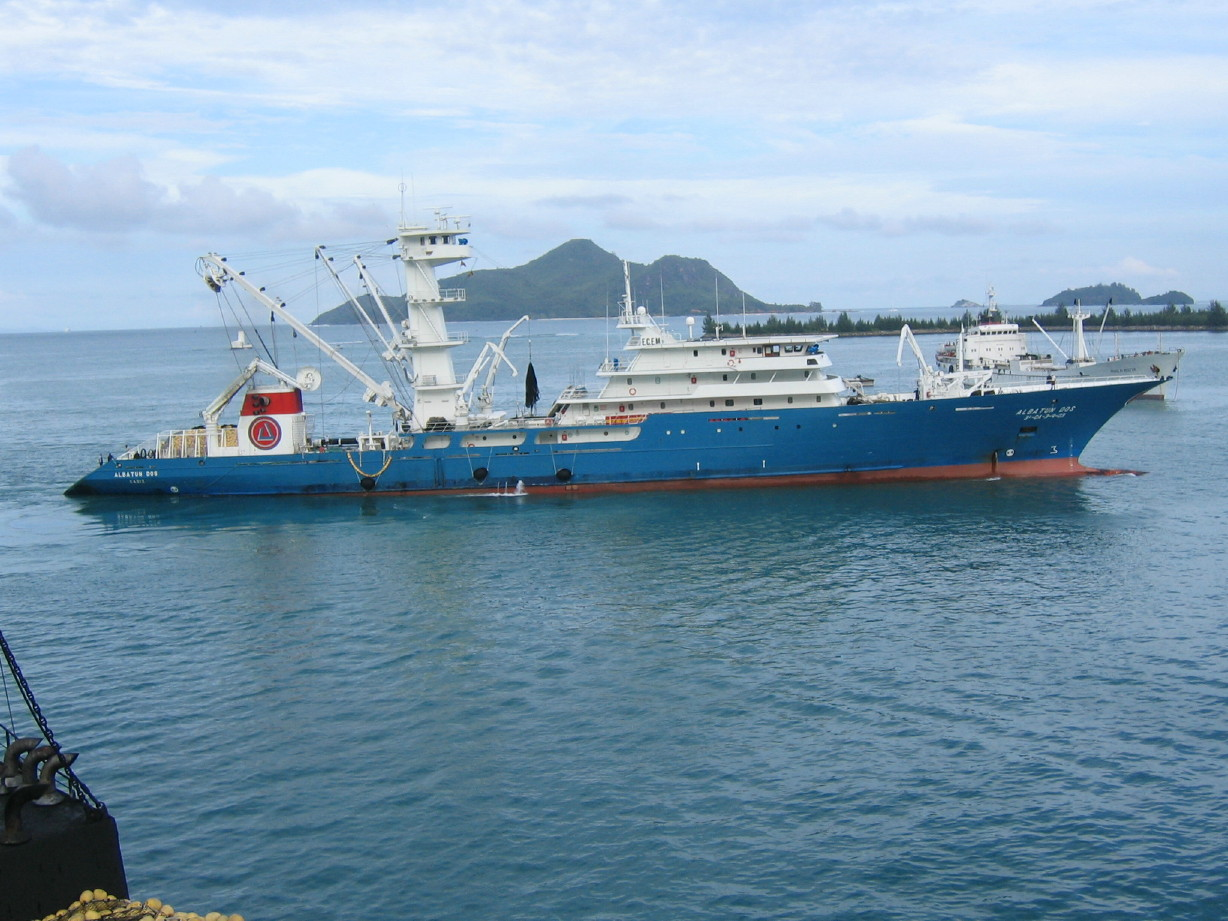
Albatun Dos, a tuna boat at work near Victoria, Seychelles

Fishing vessels are a subset of commercial vessels, but generally small in size and often subject to different regulations and classification. They can be categorized by several criteria: architecture, the type of fish they catch, the fishing method used, geographical origin, and technical features such as rigging. As of 2004, the world's fishing fleet consisted of some 4 million vessels. Of these, 1.3 million were decked vessels with enclosed areas and the rest were open vessels. Most decked vessels were mechanized, but two-thirds of the open vessels were traditional craft propelled by sails and oars. More than 60% of all existing large fishing vessels (Note: UNFAO defines a large fishing vessel as one with gross tonnage over 100 GT.) were built in Japan, Peru, the Russian Federation, Spain or the United States of America.

=== Special purpose vessels ===
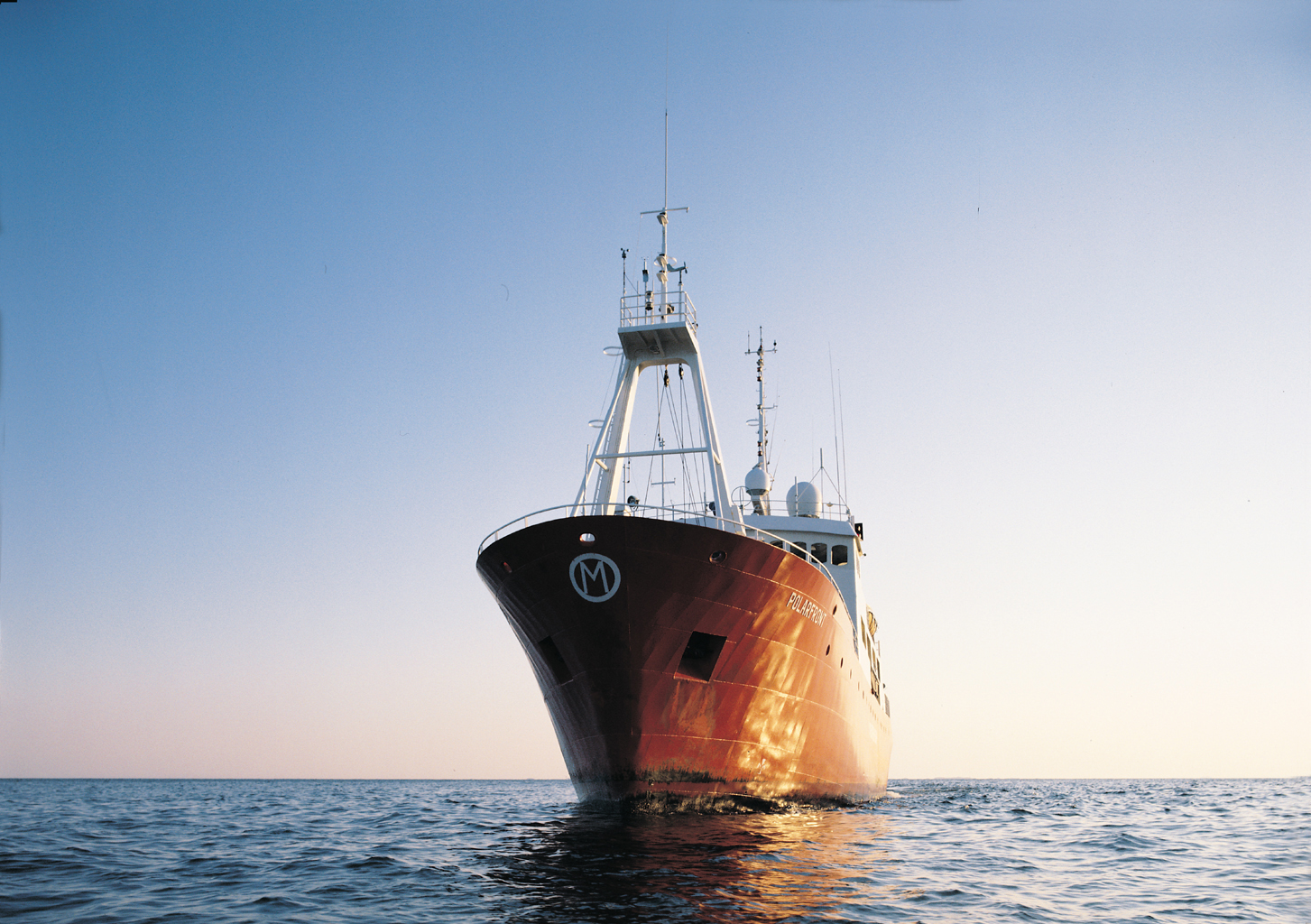
The weather ship MS Polarfront at sea

A weather ship was a ship stationed in the ocean as a platform for surface and upper air meteorological observations for use in marine weather forecasting. Surface weather observations were taken hourly, and four radiosonde releases occurred daily. It was also meant to aid in search and rescue operations and to support transatlantic flights. Proposed as early as 1927 by the aviation community, the establishment of weather ships proved to be so useful during World War II that the International Civil Aviation Organization (ICAO) established a global network of weather ships in 1948, with 13 to be supplied by the United States. This number was eventually negotiated down to nine.

The weather ship crews were normally at sea for three weeks at a time, returning to port for 10-day stretches. Weather ship observations proved to be helpful in wind and wave studies, as they did not avoid weather systems like other ships tended to for safety reasons. They were also helpful in monitoring storms at sea, such as tropical cyclones. The removal of a weather ship became a negative factor in forecasts leading up to the Great Storm of 1987. Beginning in the 1970s, their role became largely superseded by weather buoys due to the ships' significant cost. The agreement of the use of weather ships by the international community ended in 1990. The last weather ship was Polarfront, known as weather station M ("Mike"), which was put out of operation on 1 January 2010. Weather observations from ships continue from a fleet of voluntary merchant vessels in routine commercial operation.

=== Naval vessels ===
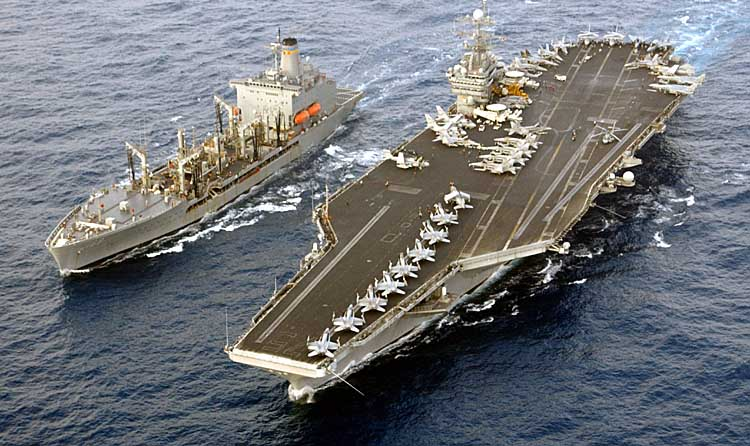
American aircraft carrier USS Harry S. Truman and a replenishment ship

Naval ships are diverse in types of vessel. They include: surface warships, submarines, and auxiliary ships.

Modern warships are generally divided into seven main categories: aircraft carriers, cruisers, destroyers, frigates, corvettes, submarines and amphibious warfare ships. The distinctions among cruisers, destroyers, frigates, and corvettes are not codified; the same vessel may be described differently in different navies. Battleships were used during the Second World War and occasionally since then (the last battleships were removed from the U.S. Naval Vessel Register in March 2006), but were made obsolete by the use of carrier-borne aircraft and guided missiles.

Most military submarines are either attack submarines or ballistic missile submarines. Until the end of World War II the primary role of the diesel/electric submarine was anti-ship warfare, inserting and removing covert agents and military forces, and intelligence-gathering. With the development of the homing torpedo, better sonar systems, and nuclear propulsion, submarines also became able to effectively hunt each other. The development of submarine-launched nuclear and cruise missiles gave submarines a substantial and long-ranged ability to attack both land and sea targets with a variety of weapons ranging from cluster munitions to nuclear weapons.

Most navies also include many types of support and auxiliary vessel, such as minesweepers, patrol boats, offshore patrol vessels, replenishment ships, and hospital ships which are designated medical treatment facilities.

Fast combat vessels such as cruisers and destroyers usually have fine hulls to maximize speed and maneuverability. They also usually have advanced marine electronics and communication systems, as well as weapons.

== Architecture ==
Some components exist in vessels of any size and purpose. Every vessel has a hull of sorts. Every vessel has some sort of propulsion, whether it's a pole, an ox, or a nuclear reactor. Most vessels have some sort of steering system. Other characteristics are common, but not as universal, such as compartments, holds, a superstructure, and equipment such as anchors and winches.

=== Hull ===
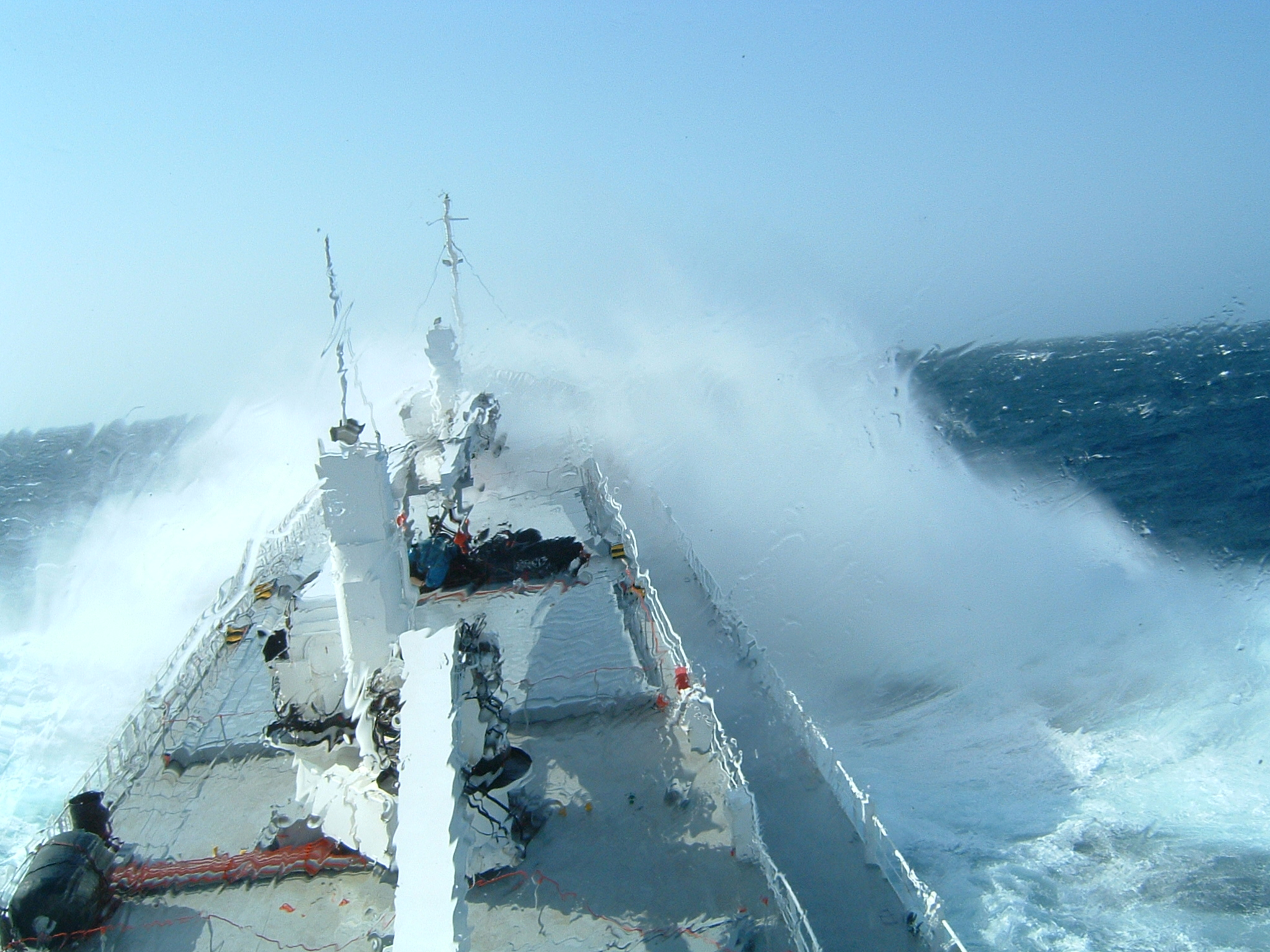
A ship's hull endures harsh conditions at sea, as illustrated by this reefer ship in bad weather.

For a ship to float, its weight must be less than that of the water displaced by the ship's hull. There are many types of hulls, from logs lashed together to form a raft to the advanced hulls of America's Cup sailboats. A vessel may have a single hull (called a monohull design), two in the case of catamarans, or three in the case of trimarans. Vessels with more than three hulls are rare, but some experiments have been conducted with designs such as pentamarans. Multiple hulls are generally parallel to each other and connected by rigid arms.

Hulls have several elements. The bow is the foremost part of the hull. Many ships feature a bulbous bow. The keel is at the very bottom of the hull, extending the entire length of the ship. The rear part of the hull is known as the stern, and many hulls have a flat back known as a transom. Common hull appendages include propellers for propulsion, rudders for steering, and stabilizers to quell a ship's rolling motion. Other hull features can be related to the vessel's work, such as fishing gear and sonar domes.

Hulls are subject to various hydrostatic and hydrodynamic constraints. The key hydrostatic constraint is that it must be able to support the entire weight of the boat, and maintain stability even with often unevenly distributed weight. Hydrodynamic constraints include the ability to withstand shock waves, weather collisions and groundings.

Older ships and pleasure craft often have or had wooden hulls. Steel is used for most commercial vessels. Aluminium is frequently used for fast vessels, and composite materials are often found in sailboats and pleasure craft. Some ships have been made with concrete hulls.

=== Propulsion systems ===
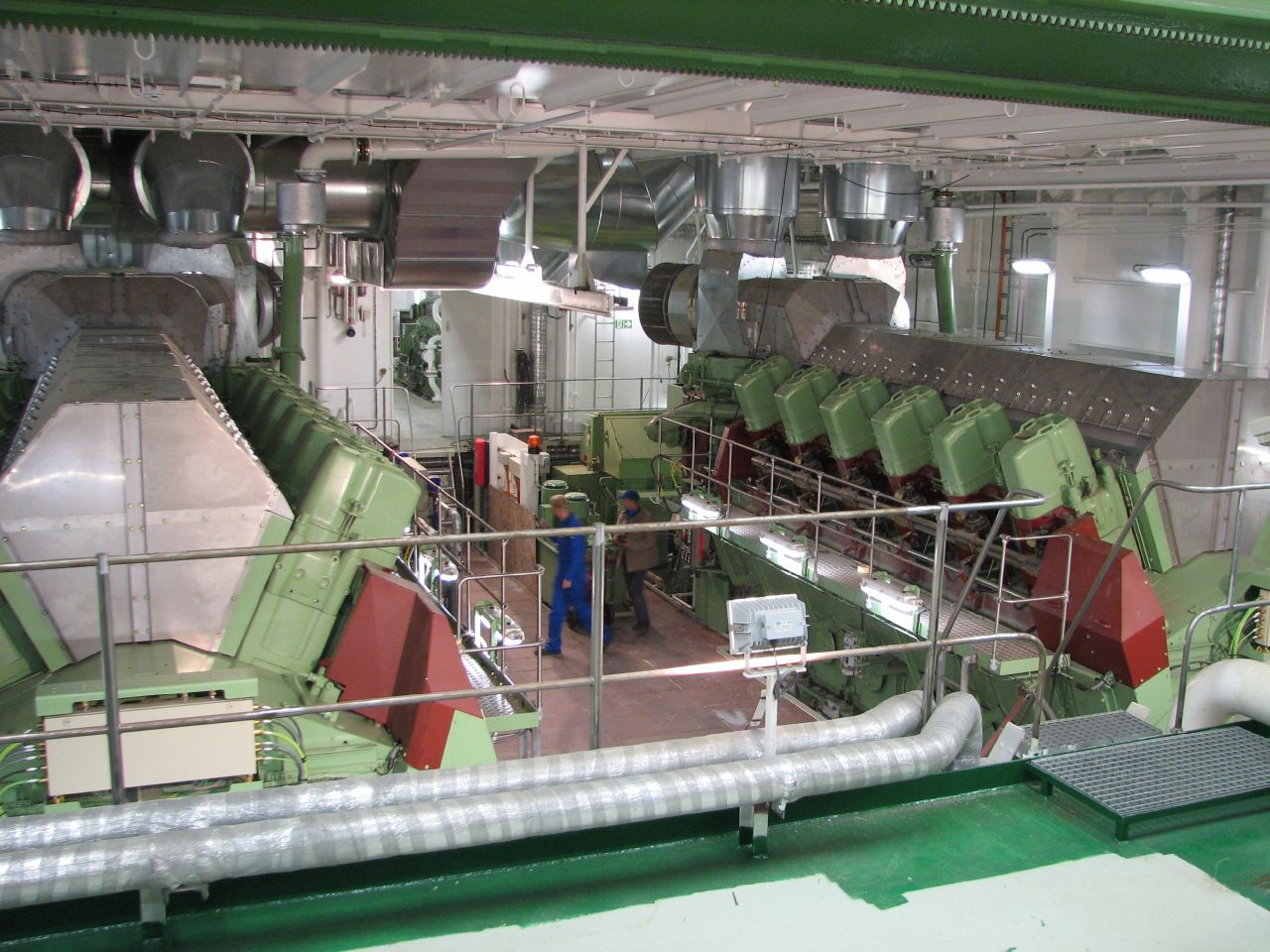
A ship's engine room

Propulsion systems for ships fall into three categories: human propulsion, sailing, and mechanical propulsion. Human propulsion includes rowing, which was used even on large galleys. Propulsion by sail generally consists of a sail hoisted on an erect mast, supported by stays and spars and controlled by ropes. Sail systems were the dominant form of propulsion until the 19th century. They are now generally used for recreation and competition, although experimental sail systems, such as the turbosails, rotorsails, and wingsails have been used on larger modern vessels for fuel savings.

Mechanical propulsion systems generally consist of a motor or engine turning a propeller, or less frequently, an impeller or wave propulsion fins. Steam engines were first used for this purpose, but have mostly been replaced by two-stroke or four-stroke diesel engines, outboard motors, and gas turbine engines on faster ships. Nuclear reactors producing steam are used to propel warships and icebreakers, and there have been attempts to use them to power commercial vessels (see NS Savannah).

In addition to traditional fixed and controllable pitch propellers there are many specialized variations, such as contra-rotating and nozzle-style propellers. Most vessels have a single propeller, but some large vessels may have up to four propellers supplemented with transverse thrusters for maneuvring at ports. The propeller is connected to the main engine via a propeller shaft and, in case of medium- and high-speed engines, a reduction gearbox. Some modern vessels have a diesel–electric powertrain in which the propeller is turned by an electric motor powered by the ship's generators.

As environmental sustainability becomes a paramount concern, the maritime industry is exploring cleaner propulsion technologies. Alternatives like LPG (Liquefied Petroleum Gas), ammonia, and hydrogen are emerging as viable options. LPG is already utilized as fuel for long-distance shipping, offering a cleaner option with a lower carbon footprint. Meanwhile, hydrogen and ammonia technologies are in development stages for long-haul applications, promising even more significant reductions in emissions and a step closer to achieving carbon-neutral shipping.

=== Steering systems ===
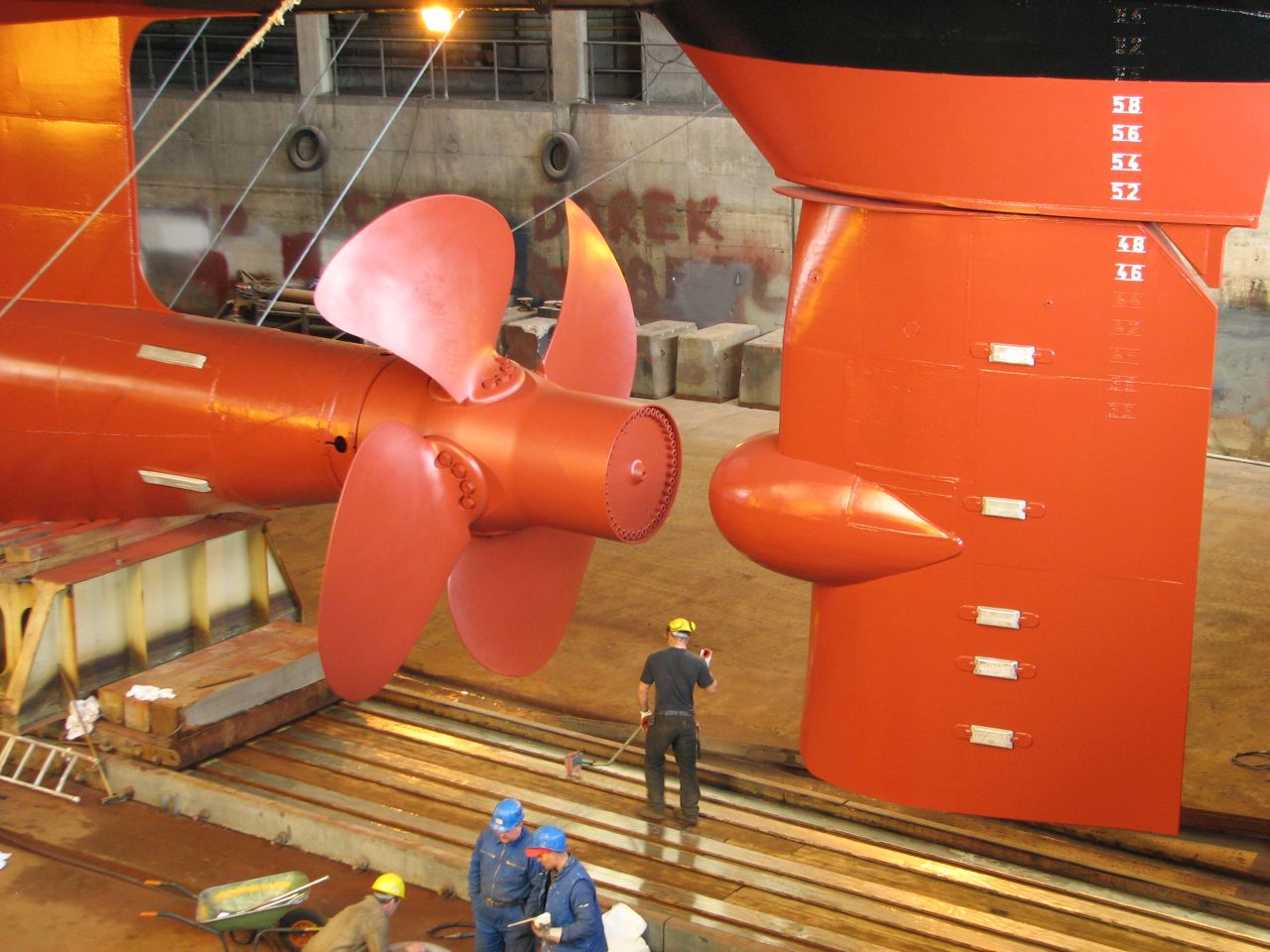
The rudder and propeller on a newly built ferry

For ships with independent propulsion systems for each side, such as manual oars or some paddles, (Note: Almost all paddle steamers had a single engine with their paddles permanently coupled, without any clutches, and so could not be used for steering. Only a few examples with separate engines were steerable. For example, the Royal Navy operated diesel–electric harbour tugs with paddles into the 1970s for their superior manoeuvrability.) steering systems may not be necessary. In most designs, such as boats propelled by engines or sails, a steering system becomes necessary. The most common is a rudder, a submerged plane located at the rear of the hull. Rudders are rotated to generate a lateral force which turns the boat. Rudders can be rotated by a tiller, manual wheels, or electro-hydraulic systems. Autopilot systems combine mechanical rudders with navigation systems. Ducted propellers are sometimes used for steering.

Some propulsion systems are inherently steering systems. Examples include the outboard motor, the bow thruster, and the azimuth thruster.

=== Holds, compartments, and the superstructure ===
Larger boats and ships generally have multiple decks and compartments. Separate berthings and heads are found on sailboats over about 25 feet (7.6 m). Fishing boats and cargo ships typically have one or more cargo holds. Most larger vessels have an engine room, a galley, and various compartments for work. Tanks are used to store fuel, engine oil, and fresh water. Ballast tanks are equipped to change a ship's trim and modify its stability.

Superstructures are found above the main deck. On sailboats, these are usually very low. On modern cargo ships, they are almost always located near the ship's stern. On passenger ships and warships, the superstructure generally extends far forward.

=== Equipment ===
Shipboard equipment varies from ship to ship depending on such factors as the ship's era, design, area of operation, and purpose. Some types of equipment that are widely found include:

- Masts can be the home of antennas, navigation lights, radar transponders, fog signals, and similar devices often required by law.
- Ground tackle comprises the anchor, its chain or cable, and connecting fittings.
- Cargo equipment such as cranes and cargo booms may be used to load and unload cargo and ship's stores.
- Safety equipment such as lifeboats, liferafts, and survival suits are carried aboard many vessels for emergency use.

== Design considerations ==
=== Hydrostatics ===
Ships float in the water at a level where mass of the displaced water equals the mass of the vessel, so that the downwards force of gravity equals the upward force of buoyancy. As a vessel is lowered into the water its weight remains constant but the corresponding weight of water displaced by its hull increases. If the vessel's mass is evenly distributed throughout, it floats evenly along its length and across its beam (width). A vessel's stability is considered in both this hydrostatic sense as well as a hydrodynamic sense, when subjected to movement, rolling and pitching, and the action of waves and wind. Stability problems can lead to excessive pitching and rolling, and eventually capsizing and sinking.

=== Hydrodynamics ===
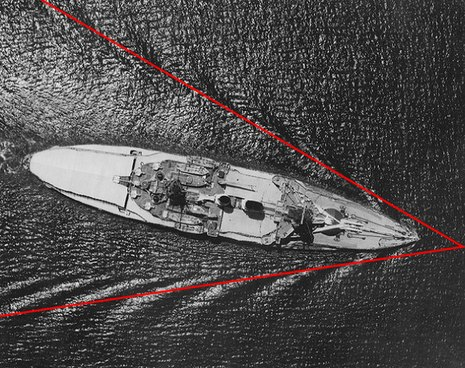
Aerial view of the German battleship Schlesien, showing a 39° wake, characteristic of vessels passing through water

Vessels move along the three axes: 1. heave, 2. sway, 3. surge, 4. yaw, 5. pitch, 6. roll

The advance of a vessel through water is resisted by the water. This resistance can be broken down into several components, the main ones being the friction of the water on the hull and wave making resistance. To reduce resistance and therefore increase the speed for a given power, it is necessary to reduce the wetted surface and use submerged hull shapes that produce low amplitude waves. To do so, high-speed vessels are often more slender, with fewer or smaller appendages. The friction of the water is also reduced by regular maintenance of the hull to remove the sea creatures and algae that accumulate there. Antifouling paint is commonly used to assist in this. Advanced designs such as the bulbous bow assist in decreasing wave resistance.

A simple way of considering wave-making resistance is to look at the hull in relation to its wake. At speeds lower than the wave propagation speed, the wave rapidly dissipates to the sides. As the hull approaches the wave propagation speed, however, the wake at the bow begins to build up faster than it can dissipate, and so it grows in amplitude. Since the water is not able to "get out of the way of the hull fast enough", the hull, in essence, has to climb over or push through the bow wave. This results in an exponential increase in resistance with increasing speed.

This hull speed is found by the formula:

$\mbox{knots} \approx 1.34 \times \sqrt{L \mbox{ft}}$

or, in metric units:

$\mbox{knots} \approx 2.5 \times \sqrt{L \mbox{m}}$

where L is the length of the waterline in feet or meters.

When the vessel exceeds a speed/length ratio of 0.94, it starts to outrun most of its bow wave, and the hull actually settles slightly in the water as it is now only supported by two wave peaks. As the vessel exceeds a speed/length ratio of 1.34, the hull speed, the wavelength is now longer than the hull, and the stern is no longer supported by the wake, causing the stern to squat, and the bow rise. The hull is now starting to climb its own bow wave, and resistance begins to increase at a very high rate. While it is possible to drive a displacement hull faster than a speed/length ratio of 1.34, it is prohibitively expensive to do so. Most large vessels operate at speed/length ratios well below that level, at speed/length ratios of under 1.0.

For large projects with adequate funding, hydrodynamic resistance can be tested experimentally in a hull testing pool or using tools of computational fluid dynamics.

Vessels are also subject to ocean surface waves and sea swell as well as effects of wind and weather. These movements can be stressful for passengers and equipment, and must be controlled if possible. The rolling movement can be controlled, to an extent, by ballasting or by devices such as fin stabilizers. Pitching movement is more difficult to limit and can be dangerous if the bow submerges in the waves, a phenomenon called pounding. Sometimes, ships must change course or speed to stop violent rolling or pitching.

== Lifecycle ==
Lines plan for the hull of a basic cargo ship

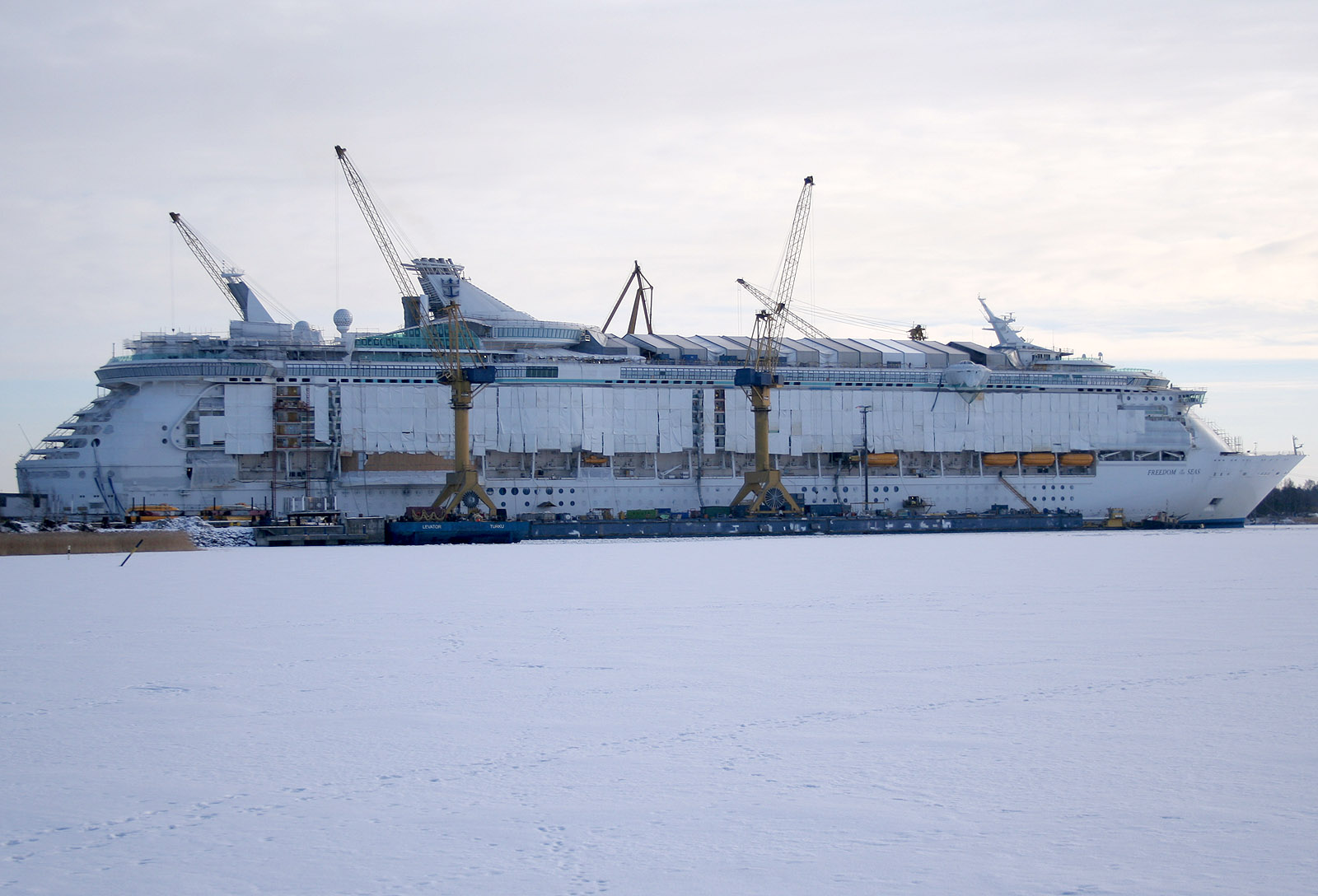
MS Freedom of the Seas under construction in a shipyard in Turku

A ship will pass through several stages during its career. The first is usually an initial contract to build the ship, the details of which can vary widely based on relationships between the shipowners, operators, designers and the shipyard. Then, the design phase carried out by a naval architect. Then the ship is constructed in a shipyard. After construction, the vessel is launched and goes into service. Ships end their careers in a number of ways, ranging from shipwrecks to service as a museum ship to the scrapyard.

=== Design ===
A vessel's design starts with a specification, which a naval architect uses to create a project outline, assess required dimensions, and create a basic layout of spaces and a rough displacement. After this initial rough draft, the architect can create an initial hull design, a general profile and an initial overview of the ship's propulsion. At this stage, the designer can iterate on the ship's design, adding detail and refining the design at each stage.

The designer will typically produce an overall plan, a general specification describing the peculiarities of the vessel, and construction blueprints to be used at the building site. Designs for larger or more complex vessels may also include sail plans, electrical schematics, and plumbing and ventilation plans.

As environmental laws are becoming more strict, ship designers need to create their design in such a way that the ship, when it nears its end-of-term, can be disassembled or disposed easily and that waste is reduced to a minimum.

=== Construction ===
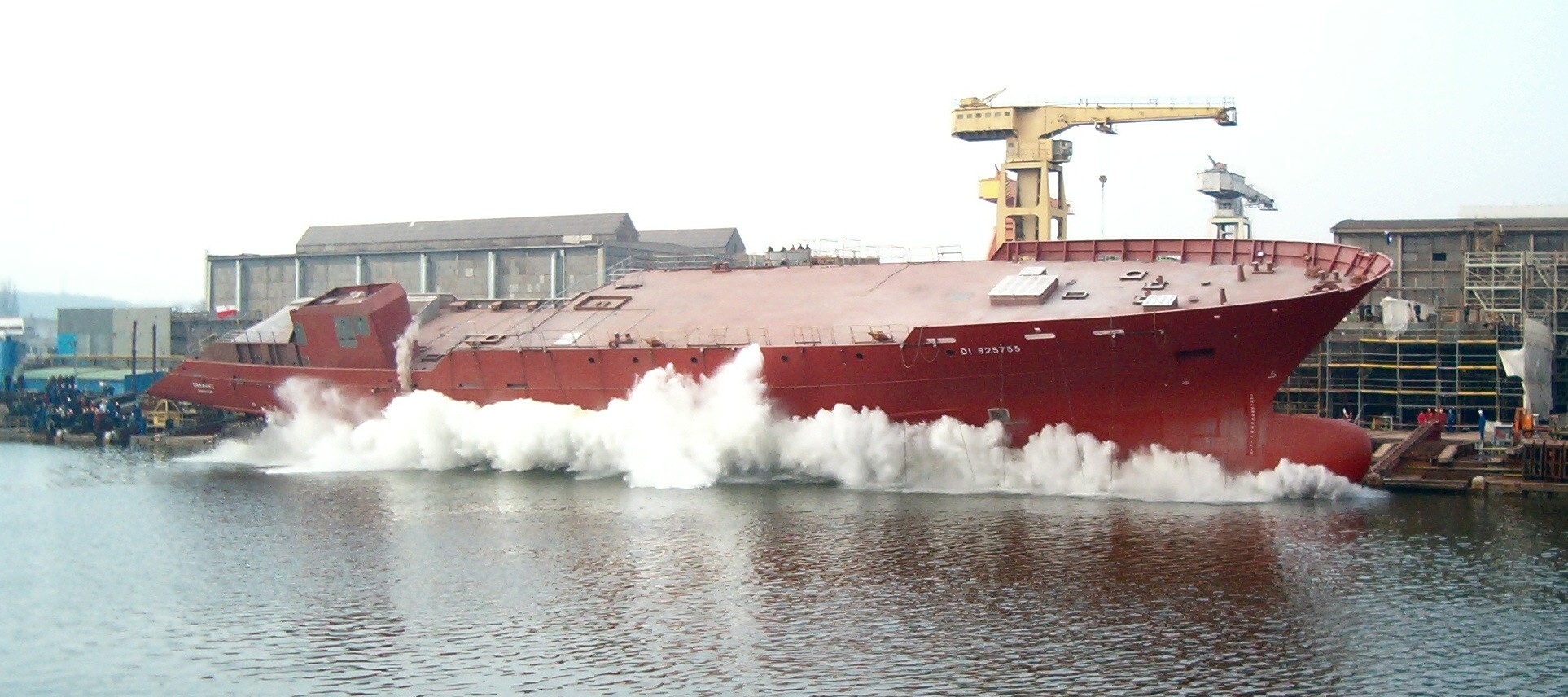
A ship launching at the Northern Shipyard in Gdańsk, Poland

Ship construction takes place in a shipyard, and can last from a few months for a unit produced in series, to several years to reconstruct a wooden boat like the frigate Hermione, to more than 10 years for an aircraft carrier. During World War II, the need for cargo ships was so urgent that construction time for Liberty Ships went from initially eight months or longer, down to weeks or even days. Builders employed production line and prefabrication techniques such as those used in shipyards today.

Hull materials and vessel size play a large part in determining the method of construction. The hull of a mass-produced fiberglass sailboat is constructed from a mold, while the steel hull of a cargo ship is made from large sections welded together as they are built.

Generally, construction starts with the hull, and on vessels over about 30 meters (98 ft), by the laying of the keel. This is done in a drydock or on land. Once the hull is assembled and painted, it is launched. The last stages, such as raising the superstructure and adding equipment and accommodation, can be done after the vessel is afloat.

Once completed, the vessel is delivered to the customer. Ship launching is often a ceremony of some significance, and is usually when the vessel is formally named. A typical small rowboat can cost under US$100, $1,000 for a small speedboat, tens of thousands of dollars for a cruising sailboat, and about $2,000,000 for a Vendée Globe class sailboat. A 25 meters (82 ft) trawler may cost $2.5 million, and a 1,000-person-capacity high-speed passenger ferry can cost in the neighborhood of $50 million. A ship's cost partly depends on its complexity: a small, general cargo ship will cost $20 million, a Panamax-sized bulk carrier around $35 million, a supertanker around $105 million and a large LNG carrier nearly $200 million. The most expensive ships generally are so because of the cost of embedded electronics: a Seawolf-class submarine costs around $2 billion, and an aircraft carrier goes for about $3.5 billion.

In 2023, the majority of the world's ships (95% of global output) were built in just three countries: China, South Korea and Japan.

=== Repair and conversion ===
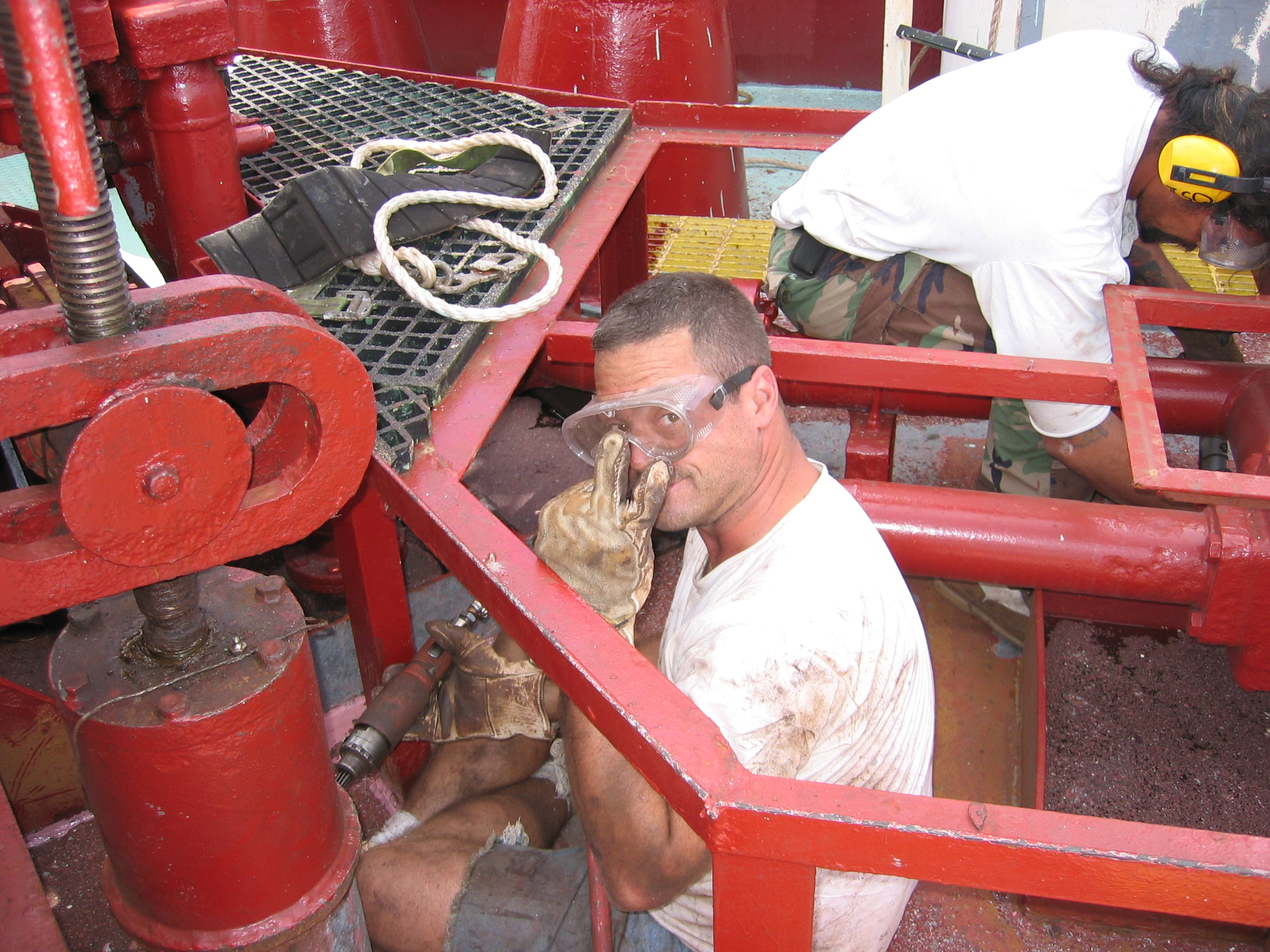
Able seaman using a needlegun scaler on a mooring winch

Ships undergo nearly constant maintenance during their career, whether they be underway, pierside, or in some cases, in periods of reduced operating status between charters or shipping seasons.

Most ships, however, require trips to special facilities such as a drydock at regular intervals. Tasks often done at drydock include removing biological growths on the hull, sandblasting and repainting the hull, and replacing sacrificial anodes used to protect submerged equipment from corrosion. Major repairs to the propulsion and steering systems as well as major electrical systems are also often performed at dry dock.

Some vessels that sustain major damage at sea may be repaired at a facility equipped for major repairs, such as a shipyard. Ships may also be converted for a new purpose: oil tankers are often converted into floating production storage and offloading units.

=== End of service ===
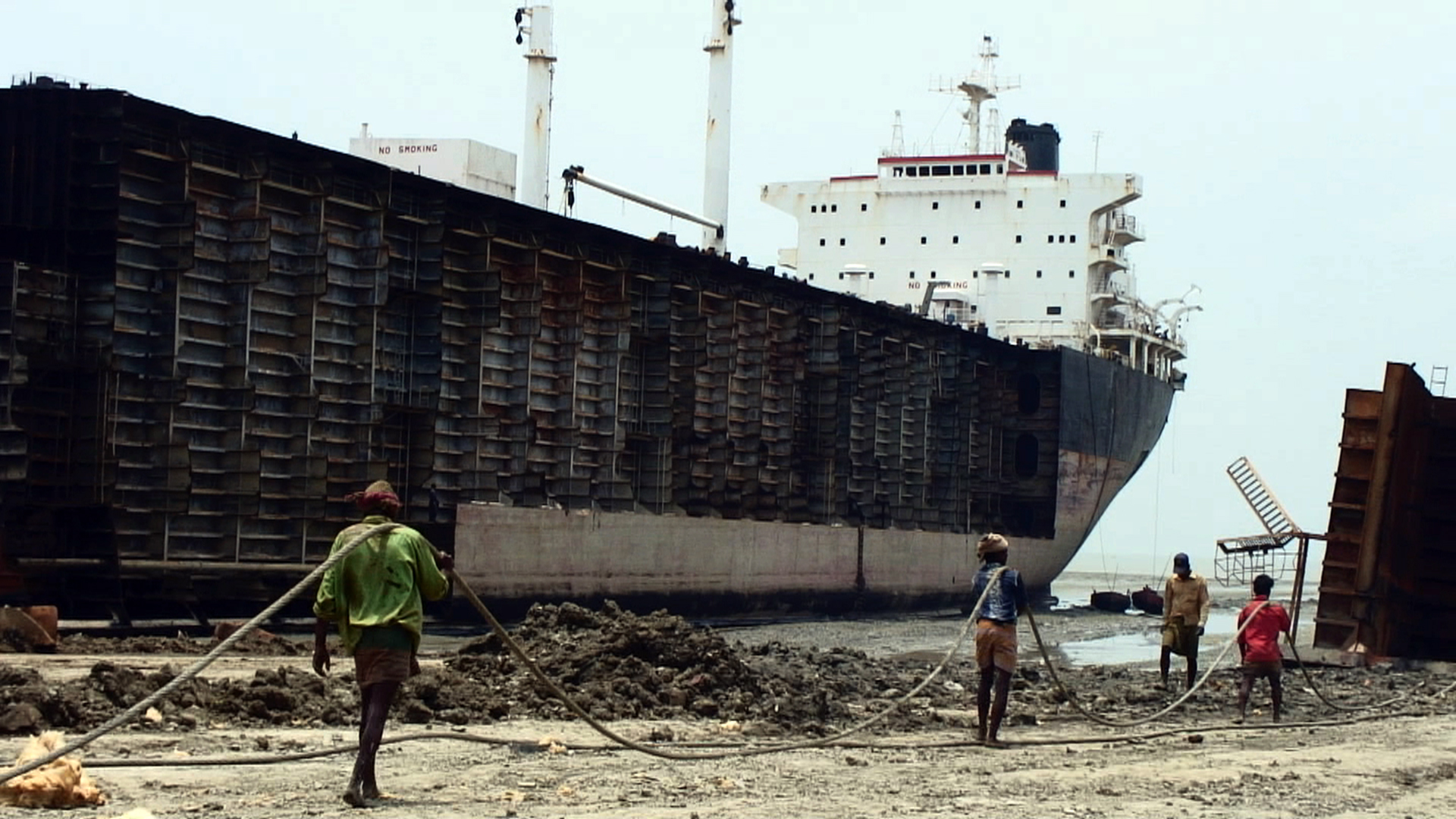
Workers drag steel plate ashore from beached ships in Chittagong, Bangladesh

Most ocean-going cargo ships have a life expectancy of between 20 and 30 years. A sailboat made of plywood or fiberglass can last between 30 and 40 years. Solid wooden ships can last much longer but require regular maintenance. Carefully maintained steel-hulled yachts can have a lifespan of over 100 years.

As ships age, forces such as corrosion, osmosis, and rotting compromise hull strength, and a vessel becomes too dangerous to sail. At this point, it can be scuttled at sea or scrapped by shipbreakers. Ships can also be used as museum ships, or expended to construct breakwaters or artificial reefs.

Many ships do not make it to the scrapyard, and are lost in fires, collisions, grounding, or sinking at sea. The Allies lost some 5,150 ships during World War II.

== Measuring ships ==
One can measure ships in terms of length overall, length between perpendiculars, length of the ship at the waterline, beam (breadth), depth (distance between the crown of the weather deck and the top of the keelson), draft (distance between the highest waterline and the bottom of the ship) and tonnage. A number of different tonnage definitions exist and are used when describing merchant ships for the purpose of tolls, taxation, etc.

load line mark (left) and load lines (right)

In Britain until Samuel Plimsoll's Merchant Shipping Act of 1876, ship-owners could load their vessels until their decks were almost awash, resulting in a dangerously unstable condition. Anyone who signed on to such a ship for a voyage and, upon realizing the danger, chose to leave the ship, could end up in jail. Plimsoll, a Member of Parliament, realised the problem and engaged some engineers to derive a fairly simple formula to determine the position of a line on the side of any specific ship's hull which, when it reached the surface of the water during loading of cargo, meant the ship had reached its maximum safe loading level. To this day, that mark, called the "Plimsoll mark", "freeboard mark" or "load line mark", exists on ships' sides, and consists of a circle with a horizontal line through the centre. On the Great Lakes of North America the circle is replaced with a diamond. Because different types of water (summer, fresh, tropical fresh, winter north Atlantic) have different densities, subsequent regulations required painting a group of lines forward of the Plimsoll mark to indicate the safe depth (or freeboard above the surface) to which a specific ship could load in water of various densities. Hence the "ladder" of lines seen forward of the Plimsoll mark to this day. These are called the "load lines" in the marine industry.

== Ship pollution ==
Ship pollution is the pollution of air and water by shipping. It is a problem that has been accelerating as trade has become increasingly globalized, posing an increasing threat to the world's oceans and waterways as globalization continues. It is expected that "shipping traffic to and from the United States is projected to double by 2020." Because of increased traffic in ocean ports, pollution from ships also directly affects coastal areas. The pollution produced affects biodiversity, climate, food, and human health. However, the degree to which humans are polluting and how it affects the world is highly debated and has been a hot international topic for the past 30 years.

=== Oil spills ===
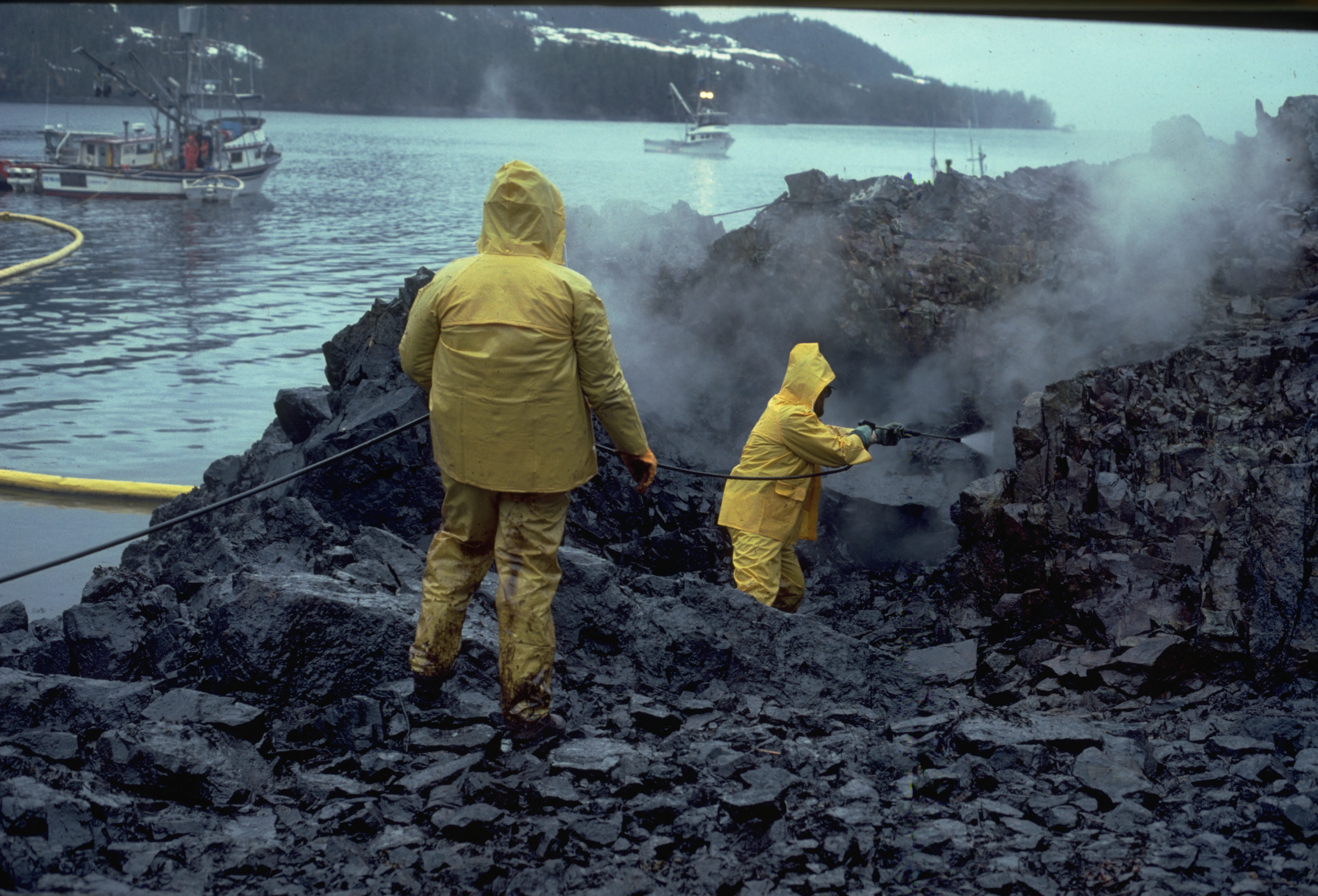
The tanker Exxon Valdez spilled 10,800,000 US gallons (8,993,000 imp gal; 40,880,000 L) of oil into Alaska's Prince William Sound.

Oil spills have devastating effects on the environment. Crude oil contains polycyclic aromatic hydrocarbons (PAHs) which are very difficult to clean up, and last for years in the sediment and marine environment. Marine species constantly exposed to PAHs can exhibit developmental problems, susceptibility to disease, and abnormal reproductive cycles.

By the sheer amount of oil carried, modern oil tankers must be considered something of a threat to the environment. An oil tanker can carry 2 million barrels (318,000 m^{3}) of crude oil, or 84,000,000 US gallons (69,940,000 imp gal; 318,000,000 L). This is more than six times the amount spilled in the widely known Exxon Valdez incident. In this spill, the ship ran aground and dumped 10,800,000 US gallons (8,993,000 imp gal; 40,880,000 L) of oil into the ocean in March 1989. Despite efforts of scientists, managers, and volunteers, over 400,000 seabirds, about 1,000 sea otters, and immense numbers of fish were killed.

The International Tanker Owners Pollution Federation has researched 9,351 accidental spills since 1974. According to this study, most spills result from routine operations such as loading cargo, discharging cargo, and taking on fuel oil. 91% of the operational oil spills were small, resulting in less than 7 tons per spill. Spills resulting from accidents like collisions, groundings, hull failures, and explosions are much larger, with 84% of these involving losses of over 700 tons.

Following the Exxon Valdez spill, the United States passed the Oil Pollution Act of 1990 (OPA-90), which included a stipulation that all tankers entering its waters be double-hulled by 2015. Following the sinkings of Erika (1999) and Prestige (2002), the European Union passed its own stringent anti-pollution packages (known as Erika I, II, and III), which require all tankers entering its waters to be double-hulled by 2010. The Erika packages are controversial because they introduced the new legal concept of "serious negligence".

=== Ballast water ===
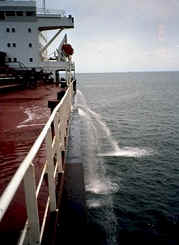
A cargo ship pumps ballast water into the tanks.

When a large vessel such as a container ship or an oil tanker unloads cargo, seawater is pumped into other compartments in the hull to help stabilize and balance the ship. During loading, this ballast water is pumped out from these compartments.

One of the problems with ballast water transfer is the transport of harmful organisms. Meinesz believes that one of the worst cases of a single invasive species causing harm to an ecosystem can be attributed to a seemingly harmless planktonic organism . Mnemiopsis leidyi, a species of comb jelly that inhabits estuaries from the United States to the Valdés peninsula in Argentina along the Atlantic coast, has caused notable damage in the Black Sea. It was first introduced in 1982, and thought to have been transported to the Black Sea in a ship's ballast water. The population of the comb jelly shot up exponentially and, by 1988, it was wreaking havoc upon the local fishing industry. "The anchovy catch fell from 204,000 tonnes (225,000 short tons; 201,000 long tons) in 1984 to 200 tonnes (220 short tons; 197 long tons) in 1993; sprat from 24,600 tonnes (27,100 short tons; 24,200 long tons) in 1984 to 12,000 tonnes (13,200 short tons; 11,800 long tons) in 1993; horse mackerel from 4,000 tonnes (4,410 short tons; 3,940 long tons) in 1984 to zero in 1993." Now that the comb jellies have exhausted the zooplankton, including fish larvae, their numbers have fallen dramatically, yet they continue to maintain a stranglehold on the ecosystem. Recently the comb jellies have been discovered in the Caspian Sea. Invasive species can take over once occupied areas, facilitate the spread of new diseases, introduce new genetic material, alter landscapes and jeopardize the ability of native species to obtain food. "On land and in the sea, invasive species are responsible for about 137 billion dollars in lost revenue and management costs in the U.S. each year."

Ballast and bilge discharge from ships can also spread human pathogens and other harmful diseases and toxins potentially causing health issues for humans and marine life alike. Discharges into coastal waters, along with other sources of marine pollution, have the potential to be toxic to marine plants, animals, and microorganisms, causing alterations such as changes in growth, disruption of hormone cycles, birth defects, suppression of the immune system, and disorders resulting in cancer, tumors, and genetic abnormalities or even death.

=== Exhaust emissions ===
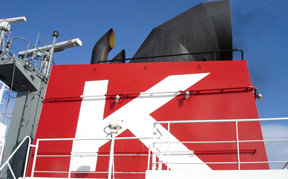
Exhaust stack on a container ship

Exhaust emissions from ships are considered to be a significant source of air pollution. "Seagoing vessels are responsible for an estimated 14 percent of emissions of nitrogen from fossil fuels and 16 percent of the emissions of sulfur from petroleum uses into the atmosphere." In Europe ships make up a large percentage of the sulfur introduced to the air, "as much sulfur as all the cars, lorries and factories in Europe put together". "By 2010, up to 40% of air pollution over land could come from ships." Sulfur in the air creates acid rain which damages crops and buildings. When inhaled, sulfur is known to cause respiratory problems and increase the risk of a heart attack.

=== Ship breaking ===
Ship breaking or ship demolition is a type of ship disposal involving the breaking up of ships for scrap recycling, with the hulls being discarded in ship graveyards. Most ships have a lifespan of a few decades before there is so much wear that refitting and repair becomes uneconomical. Ship breaking allows materials from the ship, especially steel, to be reused.

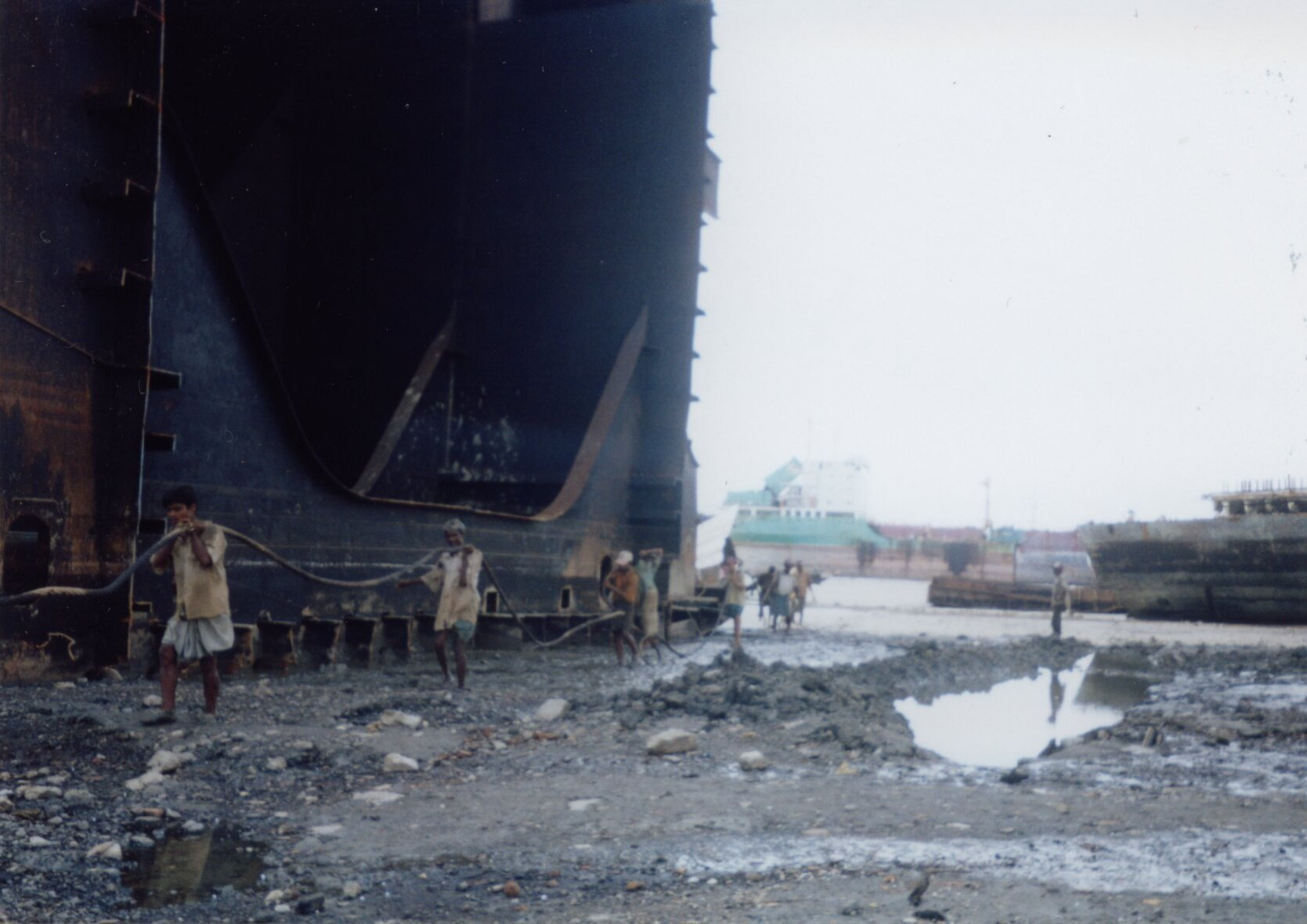
Ship breaking near Chittagong, Bangladesh

In addition to steel and other useful materials, however, ships (particularly older vessels) can contain many substances that are banned or considered dangerous in developed countries. Asbestos and polychlorinated biphenyls (PCBs) are typical examples. Asbestos was used heavily in ship construction until it was finally banned in most of the developed world in the mid-1980s. Currently, the costs associated with removing asbestos, along with the potentially expensive insurance and health risks, have meant that ship-breaking in most developed countries is no longer economically viable. Removing the metal for scrap can potentially cost more than the scrap value of the metal itself. In most of the developing world, however, shipyards can operate without the risk of personal injury lawsuits or workers' health claims, meaning many of these shipyards may operate with high health risks. Furthermore, workers are paid very low rates with no overtime or other allowances. Protective equipment is sometimes absent or inadequate. Dangerous vapors and fumes from burning materials can be inhaled, and dusty asbestos-laden areas around such breakdown locations are commonplace.

Aside from the health of the yard workers, in recent years, ship breaking has also become an issue of major environmental concern. Many developing nations, in which ship breaking yards are located, have lax or no environmental law, enabling large quantities of highly toxic materials to escape into the environment and causing serious health problems among ship breakers, the local population and wildlife. Environmental campaign groups such as Greenpeace have made the issue a high priority for their campaigns.

== See also ==
- Admiralty law
- Airship
- Auxiliary ship
- Chartering (shipping)
- Dynamic positioning
- Environmental impact of shipping
- Factory ship
- Ferry
- Flag state
- Fluyt
- Galleon
- Galley
- Glossary of nautical terms (A-L)
- Glossary of nautical terms (M-Z)
- Marine electronics
- Marine fuel management
- Maritime history
- Mother ship
- Nautical operations
- Naval architecture
- Naval ship
- Navy
- Nuclear marine propulsion
- Propulsion
- Sailing
- Sailor
- Ship burial
- Ship transport
- Ship watching
- Shipwreck
- Spaceship
- Train ferry
- Vessel safety survey
- Warship
- Watercraft
- Whaler

Model ships

- Ship model
- Ship model basin
- Ship replica

Lists

- List of fictional ships
- List of historical ship types
- List of Panamax ports
- List of largest cruise ships
- List of largest ships by gross tonnage
- List of longest ships
- Lists of ships
- Lists of shipwrecks

Ship sizes

- Aframax
- Capesize
- Chinamax
- Handymax
- Handysize
- Maersk Triple E class
- Malaccamax
- Panamax
- Q-Max
- Seawaymax
- Suezmax
- Ultra Large Crude Carrier
- Valemax
- VLCC
