= Ship disposal =

A number of different methods exist for disposing of a ship after it has reached the end of its effective or economic service life with an organisation.

== Options ==
Although many options are technically possible, some, such as deep water sinking, are not used for non-military vessels, or have come under increased scrutiny. Options currently available include:

- Hulking
- Ship breaking (involving recycling)
- Use as an artificial reef
- Donation
- Sale for re-use
- Floating (or drydock) storage
- Deep water sinking

== Description of options ==
- Hulking was a traditional method of converting a hull to another purpose after its usefulness as a ship had ended. The ship is stripped of its motive equipment (sails and rigging or motors) and is used for a variety of purposes. This practice is still in use to a limited extent.
- Ship breaking is the most common and most environmentally accepted method of ship disposal. According to various organisations, only facilities approved by the Basel Action Network's "Green Ship Recycling" program are environmentally sound options.
- Artificial reefing is the sinking of ships offshore to form reefs. Before sinking, the vessel needs to have all toxic components and electrical devices removed. Depending on the ship design this may be done relatively easily, although some designs present certain difficulties. Also the reef location needs to be determined. For these, approval must be obtained from the state authorities. According to the Rand Corporation, artificial reefing to form wreck diving sites is however still a profitable option, as the reefs are anticipated to be visited by tourists, thus generating an income.
- Donation, or sale for re-use, allows for the refurbishment and reuse of a vessel by a secondary party. Such uses can include further life as a ship, houseboat, office, hotel, museum, or conference center.
- Deep water sinking or SINKEX is the sinking of ships during target practice. Before the ships are sunk they are cleaned of all toxic components and devices, so that no environmental pollution should occur.
- Floating or drydock storage involves storing the boat on or off water for a period of time. Storage on water is an expensive method as after 30 years the ships need extensive repairs due to corrosion by the seawater. Storage in drydocks is also expensive. Regular storage on shore, outside a dock, is also a possibility.

== Illegal ship disposal ==
Some shipping companies have in the past attempted to dispose of their ships illegally, often due to the high costs of sanitizing these ships in a legal way as a result of the presence of large quantities of toxic compounds and materials. Prominent examples of where environmental concerns have complicated the planned disposal of ships have been the Norwegian Cruise Lines vessels SS Norway and SS Oceanic, as well as the French aircraft carrier Clemenceau. Although in the past there were few effective controls on ship disposal, and the risk of being caught was therefore limited, national authorities as well as environmental organisations are now more vigilant. Ships are sometimes tracked when they are nearing the end of their lifespan. Companies caught disposing of ships illegally face hefty fines.
