= North Koʻolaupoko, Hawaii =

Census-designated place in Hawaii, USA

Waikāne North Koʻolaupoko
- Census-designated place
- Location in Honolulu County and the state of Hawaii
- Coordinates: 21°29′43″N 157°51′6″W
- Country: United States
- State: Hawaii
- County: Honolulu

Area
  - Total: 7.2 sq mi (18.6 km^{2})
  - Land: 6.8 sq mi (17.7 km^{2})
  - Water: 0.35 sq mi (0.9 km^{2})
- Elevation: 46 ft (14 m)

Population (2010)
  - Total: 778
  - Density: 114/sq mi (44.0/km^{2})

Waikāne (Hawaiian pronunciation: [vɐjˈkaːne]; LL-Q33569 (haw)-Noaius Paticus-Waikāne.wav), also known as North Koʻolaupoko ([-koʔolɐwˈpoko]; LL-Q33569 (haw)-Noaius Paticus-Koʻolaupoko.wav), is an area and census-designated place in the County of Honolulu, Hawaii, United States, on the island of Oʻahu. It had a population of 778 at the 2010 census. In Hawaiian, koʻolau poko means "short windward", referring to the fact that this is the shorter of the two windward districts on the island (Koʻolauloa or "long windward" is the other). Koʻolaupoko extends from Makapuʻu Point on the southeast to Kaʻōʻio Point on the north. Included within the district, south of North Koʻolaupoko, are the largest windward towns of Kāneʻohe, Kailua, and Waimānalo.

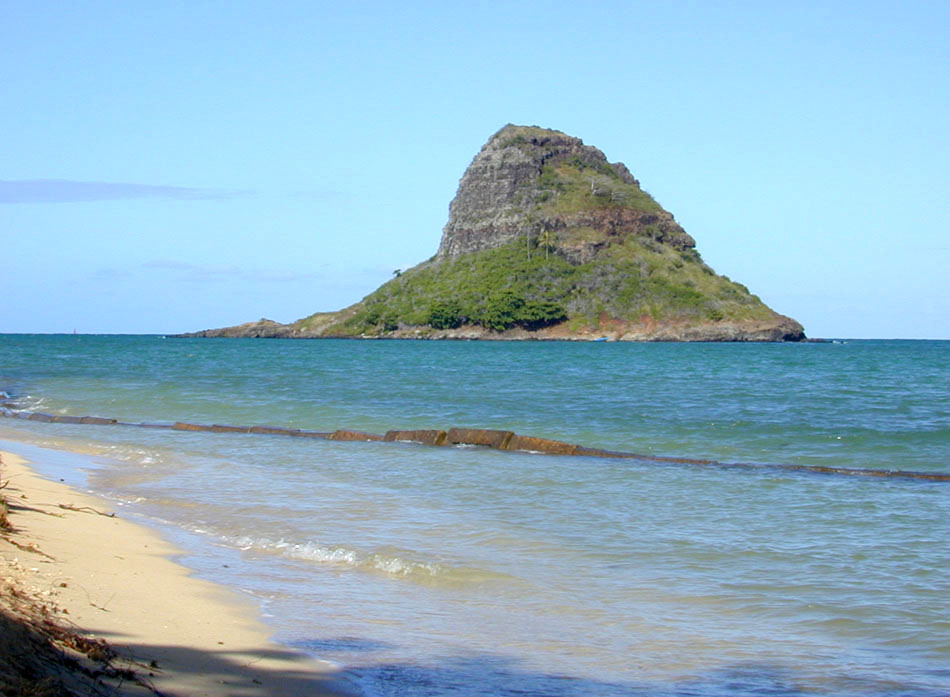
Mokoliʻi Islet, at the north end of Kāneʻohe Bay, seen here from the south shore of Kualoa Beach Park

Waikāne lies mostly along the coastline of Kāneʻohe Bay and consists of several lush valleys that extend inland to the steep face of the Koʻolau pali (cliff). The first valley north of Kahaluʻu is Waiāhole. Next is Waikāne, then Hakipuʻu, and northernmost is Kualoa. This area differs from the towns, valleys, and ahupuaʻa of the southern part of Koʻolaupoko in that it is mostly undeveloped, decidedly rural in character, with many small farms.

Despite the long shoreline, public access to Kāneʻohe Bay is somewhat limited by private holdings. A small community park at Waiāhole was enlarged and improved in 2003. A larger city and county park at Kualoa provides camping and picnic areas, a long narrow beach, and views of Mokoliʻi Islet. The south side of Kualoa Regional Park faces onto Kāneʻohe Bay, and the east shore is a fringing reef off the Pacific Ocean coast of northeast Oʻahu.

The U.S. postal code for all of North Koʻolaupoko is 96744 (the same as Kāneʻohe).

== Geography ==
The Waikāne census-designated place (CDP) is located at 21°29'47" North, 157°51'34" West (21.496355, -157.859321). Southward along the shore of Kāneʻohe Bay via Kamehameha Highway (State Rte. 83) are (from Waikāne) Waiāhole and Kahaluʻu. Northwest up the coast beyond Kualoa and Kaʻōʻio Point is the town of Kaʻaʻawa.

The Waikane CDP encompasses much more than the location known as Waikāne, which is but one of several valleys comprising the north end of the Koʻolaupoko District. The CDP has a total area of 7.2 square miles (18.6 km^{2}), of which 6.8 square miles (17.7 km^{2}) is land and 0.35 square miles (0.9 km^{2}) is water. The total area is 4.88% water.

== Demographics ==
As of the 2000 census, there were 726 people in the northern part of the Waikane CDP, with 188 households and 156 families residing there. The population density was 106.4 inhabitants per square mile (41.1/km^{2}). There were 198 housing units at an average density of 29.0 per square mile (11.2/km^{2}). The racial makeup of the CDP was 16.94% White, 0.14% Black or African American, 0.28% Native American, 19.15% Asian, 22.45% Pacific Islander, 1.79% from other races, and 39.26% from two or more races. 5.10% of the population were Hispanic or Latino of any race.

There were 188 households, out of which 32.4% had children under the age of 18 living with them, 59.0% were married couples living together, 14.4% had a female householder with no husband present, and 16.5% were non-families. 11.2% of all households were made up of individuals, and 4.3% had someone living alone who was 65 years of age or older. The average household size was 3.86 and the average family size was 4.09.

In the CDP the population was spread out, with 28.1% under the age of 18, 8.1% from 18 to 24, 26.9% from 25 to 44, 27.4% from 45 to 64, and 9.5% who were 65 years of age or older. The median age was 34 years. For every 100 females, there were 96.2 males. For every 100 females age 18 and over, there were 94.8 males.

The median income for a household in the CDP was $55,179, and the median income for a family was $53,625. Males had a median income of $31,786 versus $25,313 for females. The per capita income for the tract was $15,592. 11.6% of the population and 4.3% of families were below the poverty line. Out of the total population, 16.1% of those under the age of 18 and 2.0% of those 65 and older were living below the poverty line.

== Education ==
Hawaii Department of Education operates Waiāhole Elementary School in Waikane CDP.

== See also ==
- Waiāhole-Waikāne struggle
