= Puʻu Hawaiʻiloa =

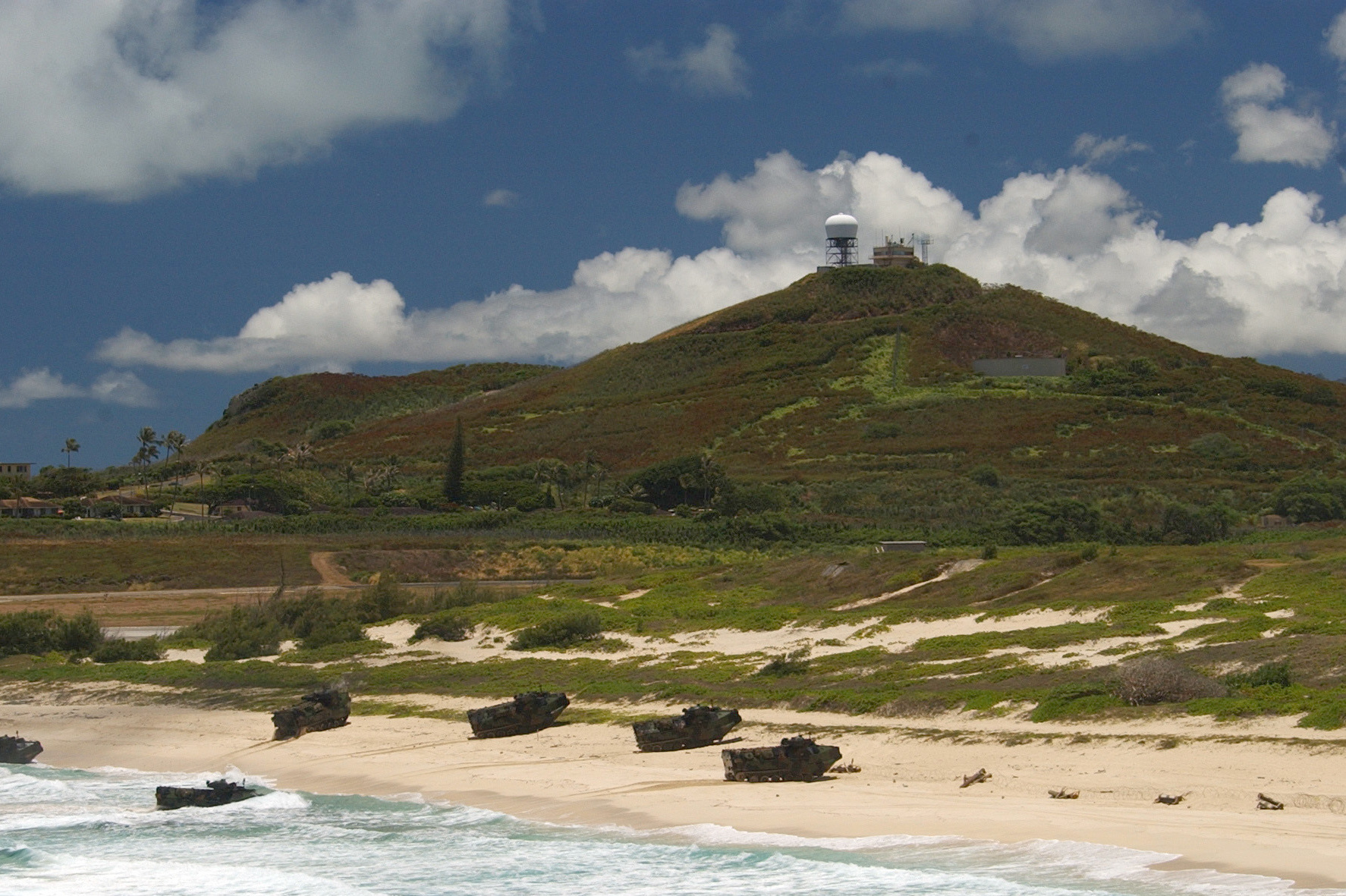
- A photo of Pu'u Hawai'iloa by Marine Corps Base Hawaii

Highest point
- Elevation: 337 ft (103 m)
- Coordinates: 21°26′53″N 157°45′24″W

Geography
- Location within Hawaii
- Location: Honolulu County, Hawaii, United States

Geology
- Mountain type: Cinder cone
- Last eruption: 450,000 - 420,000

Puʻu Hawaiʻiloa is a cinder cone located in Honolulu County, Hawaii on the Mokapu Peninsula.

Much like neighboring Ulupaʻu Crater. it formed as a vent of the Koʻolau Range during the Honolulu Volcanic Series. The material of the cone is nepheline basalt. Puʻu Hawaiʻiloa is used by Marine Corps Base Hawaii and the Wailuku Community Center is next to it.

== See also ==
- Honolulu Volcanics
- Koʻolau Range
- Ulupaʻu Crater
- Marine Corps Base Hawaii
- Kāneʻohe Bay
