= Buada =

Buada may refer to:

- Buada district, Nauru
- Buada constituency, Nauru
- Buada Lagoon, Nauru
- Sébastien Buada (born 1977), French rugby union player and coach
