= Ulupaʻu Crater =

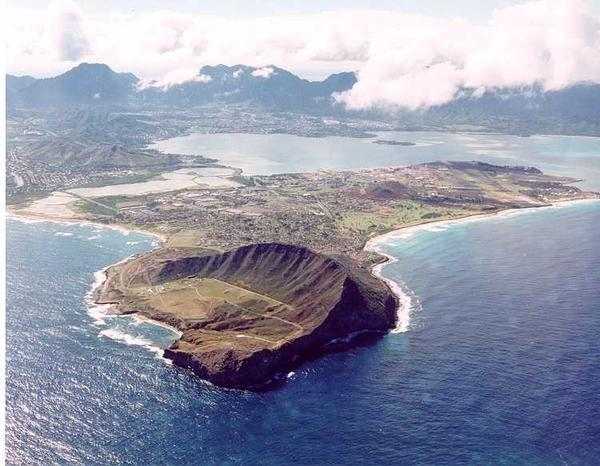
- Aerial view of Ulupaʻu Crater and the rest of the Mokapu Peninsula

Highest point
- Elevation: 659 ft (201 m)
- Coordinates: 21°27′16″N 157°43′54″W

Geography
- Location within Hawaii
- Location: Honolulu County, Hawaii, United States

Geology
- Mountain type: Tuff cone
- Last eruption: 600,000 - 400,000 years ago

Ulupaʻu Crater (also known as Ulupaʻu Head) is a tuff cone in the U.S. state of Hawaii, located near Marine Corps Base Hawaii on the Mokapu Peninsula.

It formed as a result of the Honolulu Volcanic Series, which was a set of eruptions from the Koʻolau Range during its rejuvenation stage. The HVS also created other volcanoes such as Diamond Head. The eastern part of Ulupaʻu's rim was destroyed due to erosion. A cinder cone known as Puʻu Hawaiʻiloa is located nearby on the same peninsula.

== See also ==
- Honolulu Volcanics
- Koʻolau Range
- Marine Corps Base Hawaii
- Cinder cone
- Puʻu Hawaiʻiloa
- Kāneʻohe Bay
