= Marine Corps Base Hawaii =

US Marine Corps base near Honolulu, Oahu, Hawaii, United States

- Mokapu Peninsula, Oahu, Hawaiʻi
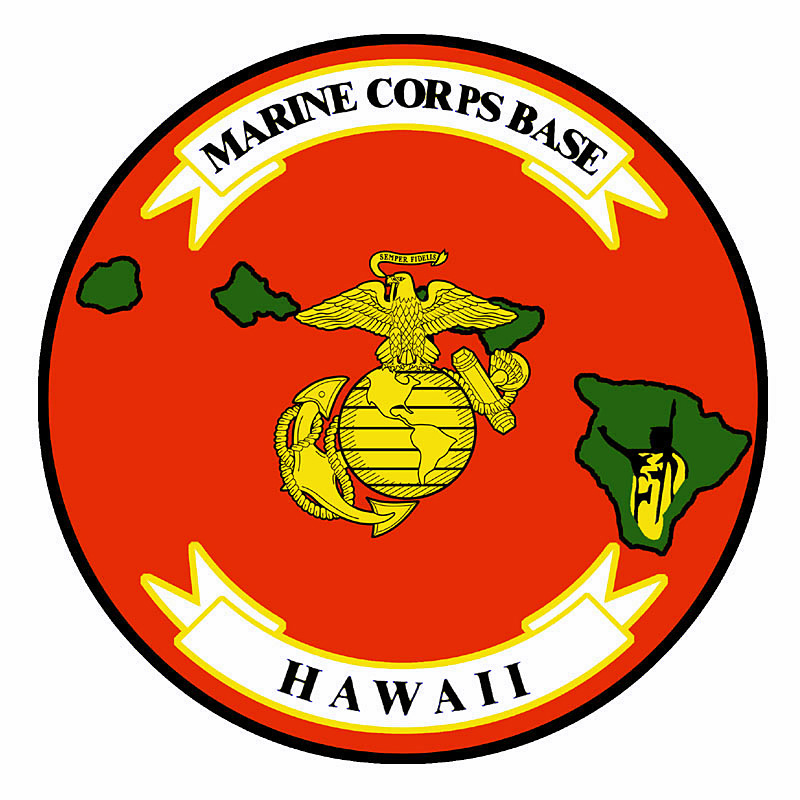
- Marine Corps Base Hawaii insignia

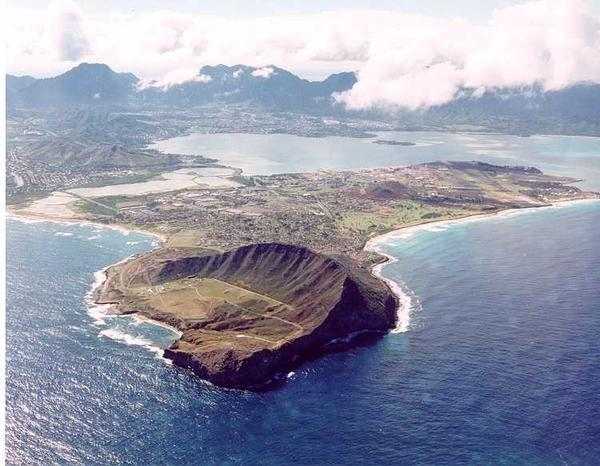
- Aerial photograph of Marine Corps Base Hawaii

Site information
- Type: Military base
- Controlled by: United States Marine Corps

Location
- Location within Hawaii
- Coordinates: 21.443611°N 157.748889°W

Site history
- Built: 1919
- Built by: United States Army; United States Navy
- In use: 1918–49; 1952–present
- Battles/wars: Pacific War: Attack on Pearl Harbor
- Events: Winter White House

Garrison information
- Past commanders: Col. Raul Lianez
- Garrison: 3rd Marine Regiment; Marine Aircraft Group 24; Combat Logistics Battalion 3; 3rd Radio Battalion; Commander, Patrol and Reconnaissance Wing 2 (US Navy)

Marine Corps Base Hawaii (MCBH), formerly Marine Corps Air Station Kaneohe Bay and originally Naval Air Station Kaneohe Bay, is a U.S. Marine Corps facility and air station located on the Mokapu Peninsula of windward O'ahu in the City & County of Honolulu. Marine Corps Base Hawaii is home to Marines, Sailors, their family members, and civilian employees. The United States Marine Corps operates a 7,800-foot (2,400 m) runway at the base.

MCBH is home for the 3rd Marine Littoral Regiment, Marine Aircraft Group 24, Combat Logistics Company 33 (CLC-33), 3rd Radio Battalion, and the Navy's Patrol and Reconnaissance Wing 2.

The base lies between the two largest windward O'ahu communities of Kailua and Kāne'ohe, and the main gate is reached at the eastern end of Interstate H-3. The main access to the base is by either H-3 or Mokapu Road. MCB Hawaii is located on the windward side of Oahu, approximately 12 miles (19 km) northeast of Honolulu. Marine Corps Base Hawaii occupies the entire Mokapu Peninsula, an area of 2,951 acres (1,194 ha; 11.94 km^{2}). Two areas of the base are classified as conservation land, including the Ulupaʻu Crater area (northeast peninsula) and the Nu'upia Pond area (at the Mokapu Road).

== History ==
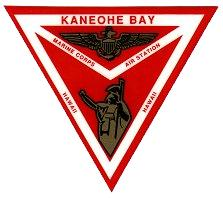
Old MCAS Kaneohe Bay insignia.

In 1918, President Woodrow Wilson designated 322 acres (130 ha; 1.30 km^{2}) of land on Mokapu Peninsula as the U.S. Army's Kuwaaohe Military Reservation. In December 1940, Fort Kuwaahoe was renamed Fort Hase, in honor of Major General William Frederick Hase, who served as Chief of Staff for the Army's Hawaiian Department from April 1934 to January 1935.

In 1927 the Army began building coastal artillery batteries. In September 1939, the Navy began constructing a seaplane base, filling in part of Kaneohe Bay to add 280 acres to the station and building runways, hangars and other buildings. Naval Air Station Kaneohe Bay was officially commissioned on February 15, 1941, with a flag raising and formal commissioning ceremony and its role was expanded to include the administration of the Kaneohe Bay Naval Defense Sea Area.

=== Attack on Pearl Harbor ===
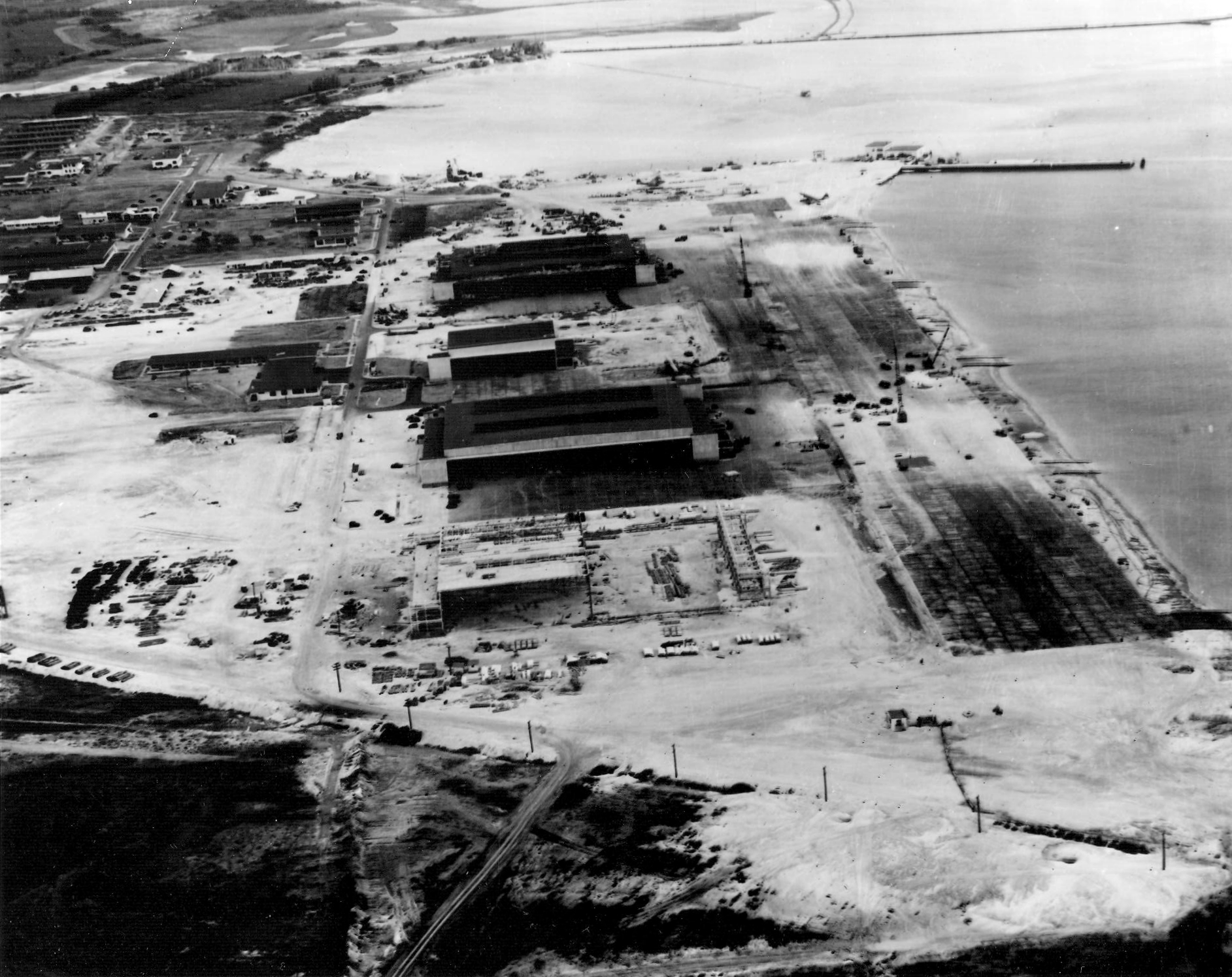
Aerial photograph of Naval Air Station Kaneohe Bay two days after the Attack on Pearl Harbor.

On 7 December 1941, Naval Air Station Kaneohe Bay was attacked approximately 9 minutes before the attack on Pearl Harbor. The gunners there shot down 3 airplanes, two went into Kaneohe Bay while another one crashed into the base of Radar Hill. The crash site has a memorial to the pilot who died.

=== Post World War II ===
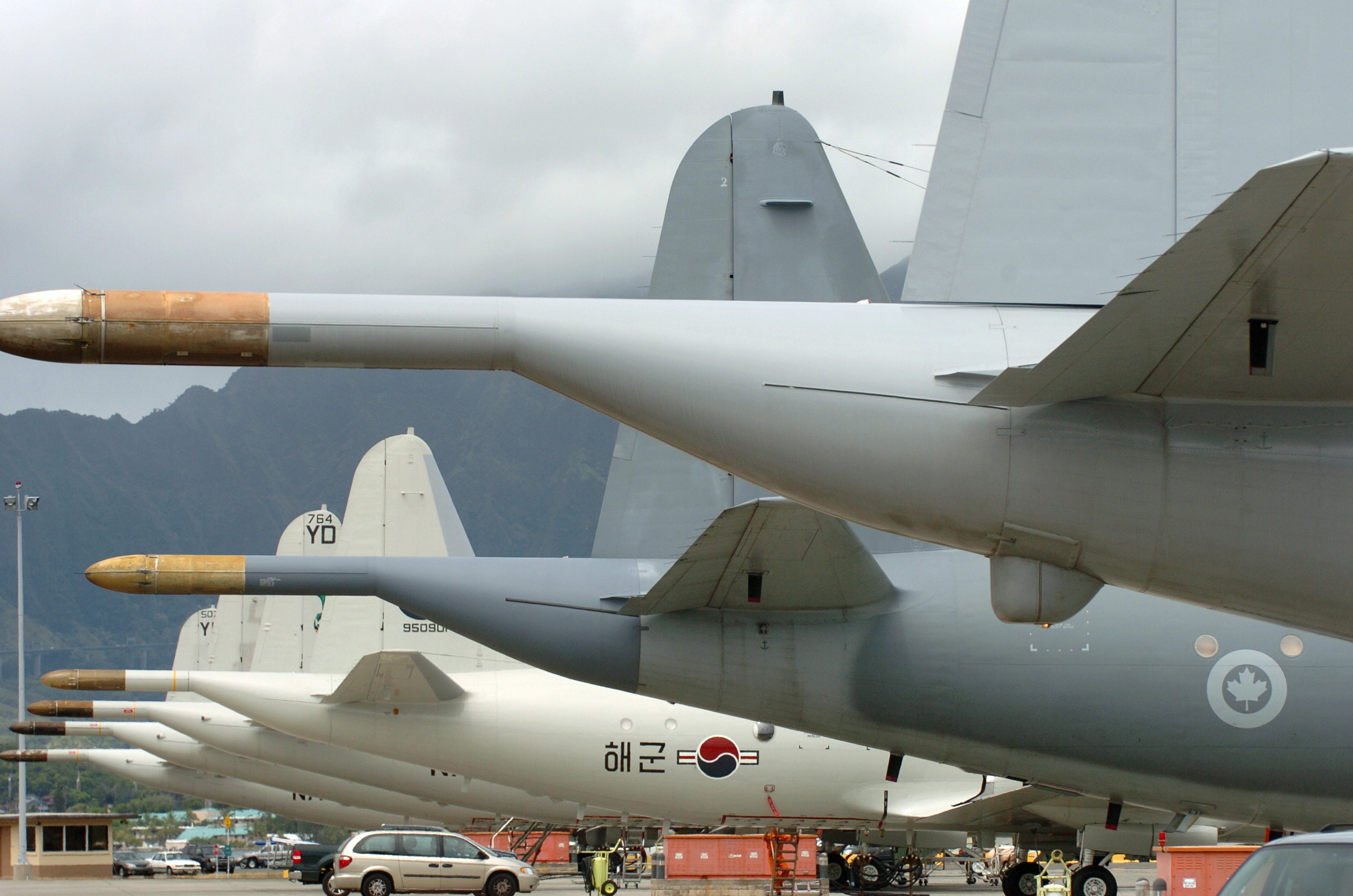
Royal Canadian Air Force and Korean Navy P-3s on the flightline at the base.

In 1951, the Marines assumed control of the air station activities when naval aviation moved to Barbers Point Naval Air Station. On 15 January 1952, Marine Corps Air Station Kaneohe Bay was commissioned. On 15 April 1994, the Marine Corps consolidated all of its installations in Hawaii. MCAS Kaneohe Bay, Camp H. M. Smith, Molokai Training Support Facility, Manana Family Housing Area, Puuloa Range, and the Pearl City Warehouse Annex combined to form a new command, the Marine Corps Base Hawaii, headquartered at MCBH Kaneohe Bay.

All U.S. military units located in Hawaii fall under the command of the U.S. Indo-Pacific Command (USINDOPACOM) which is headquartered at Camp H. M. Smith on Oahu. The Commanding General of Marine Forces Pacific (MARFORPAC) also commands 12 Marine Corps bases and stations in Arizona, California, Hawaii, and Japan, operational forces in Hawaii and Okinawa Prefecture, and units deployed to Southeast/west Asia.

In 2010, parts of the movie Battleship were filmed aboard MCBH.

=== Incidents ===
On 20 November 2023, a P-8A Poseidon of the US Navy approached to land on Runway 22 in rain and reduced visibility. It was unable to stop and overshot the runway, ending in Kāneʻohe Bay. The crew of 9 was rescued by US Coast Guard boats. The plane was from Patrol Squadron 4 ("Skinny Dragons") based at Naval Air Station Whidbey Island in Washington state.

== Geography ==
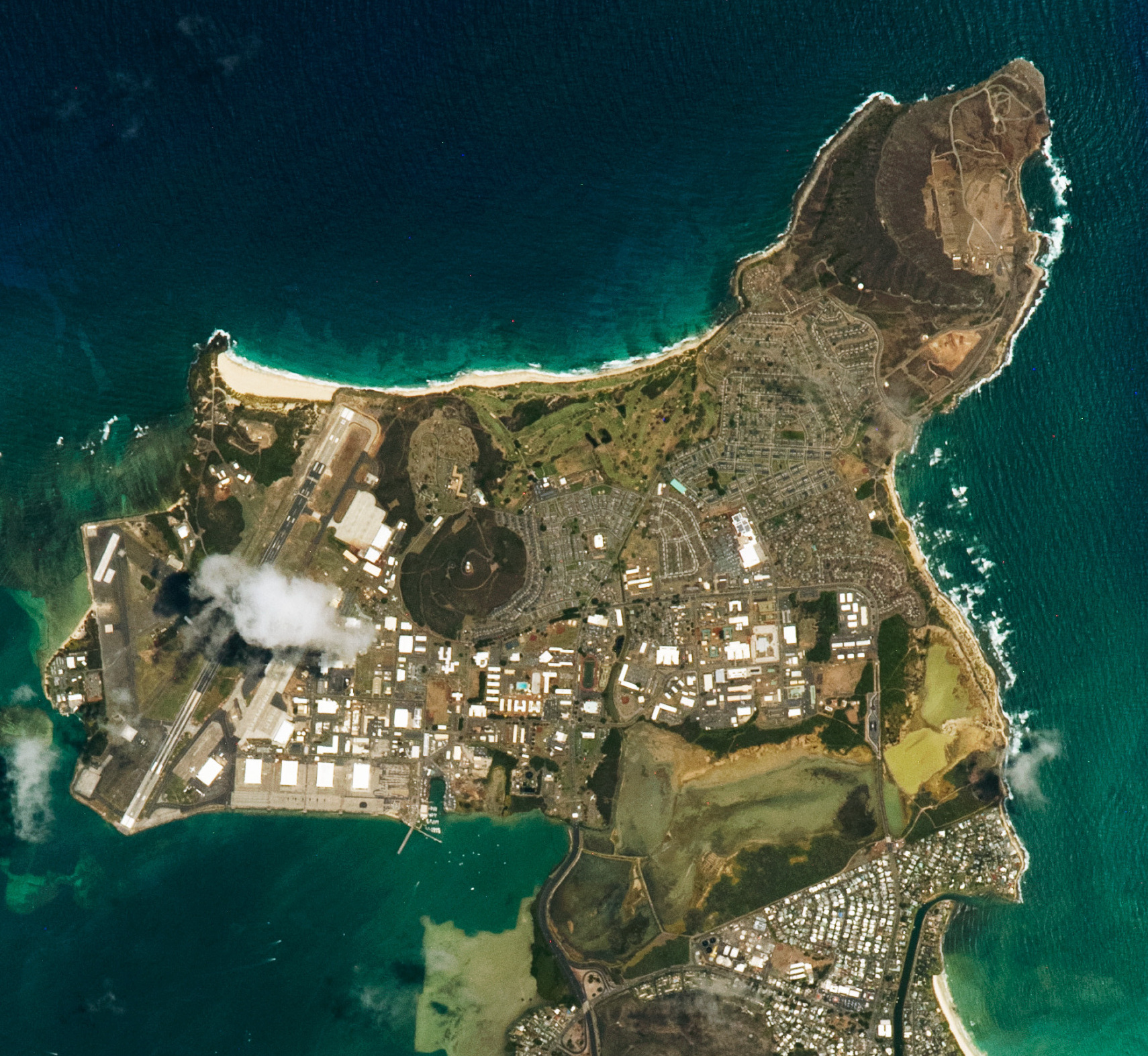
Marine Corps Base Hawaii seen from the International Space Station, 2022

According to the United States Census Bureau, the base has a total area of 5.8 square miles (15 km^{2}), of which 4.4 square miles (11 km^{2}) is land and 1.4 square miles (3.6 km^{2}), or 24.74%, is water. It is dominated by two large volcanic formations, Radar Hill and Ulapau Crater. Radar Hill stands 646 ft tall and is home to Kansas Tower which is a former Radar Station hence the name Radar Hill. On the other side of the base lays Ulapau Crater. It stands 659 ft tall and looms over the base.

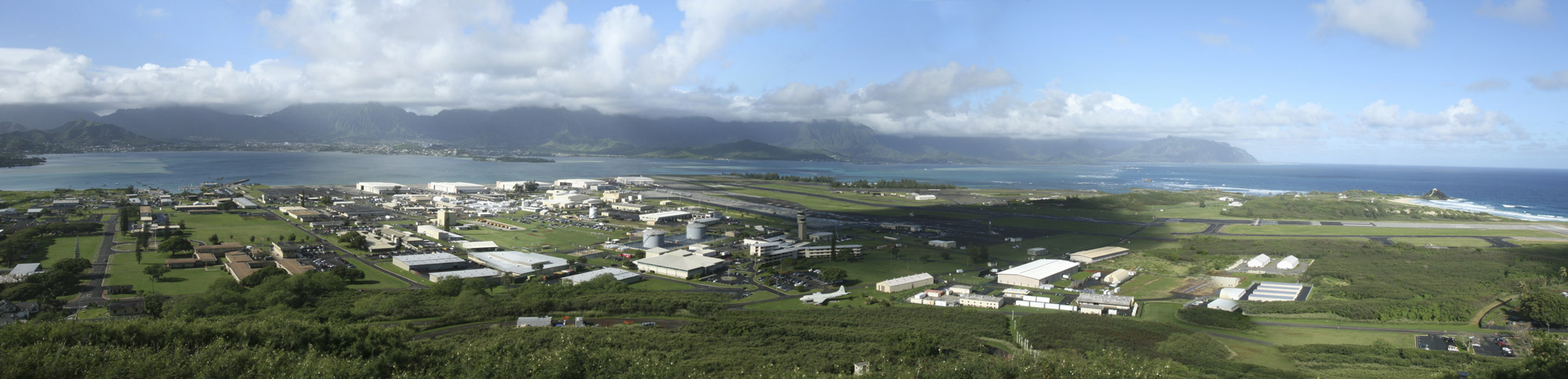
A panoramic view of Marine Corps Base Hawaii and Kaneohe Bay, taken from the top of K-T.

== Demographics ==
Kāneʻohe Base CDP
- Census-designated place
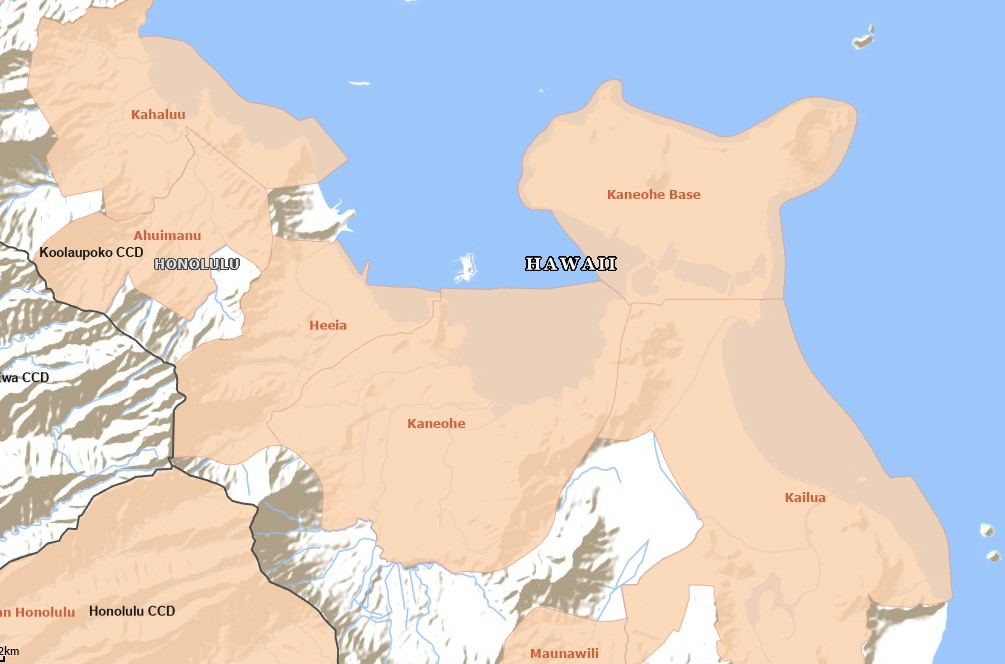

- Location within Hawaii Location within the United States
- Coordinates: 21.443611°N 157.748889°W
- Country: United States
- State: Hawaii
- County: Honolulu
- Elevation: 7 ft (2.1 m)
- Time zone: UTC−6 (Central (CST))
  - Summer (DST): UTC−5 (CDT)
- GNIS feature ID: 2414064

For census purposes, the area is demarcated as the Kāneʻohe Base census-designated place (CDP), with a population at the 2020 Census of 9,483. The CDP was formerly known as Kāneʻohe Station.

Historical population
Census	Pop.	Note	%±
2000	11,827		—
2010	9,517		−19.5%
2020	9,483		−0.4%
U.S. Decennial Census; 2010 2020 listed as Kaneohe Station in 2010

=== 2020 census ===
Kāneʻohe Base CDP, Hawaii - Demographic Profile (NH = Non-Hispanic) Note: the US Census treats Hispanic/Latino as an ethnic category. This table excludes Latinos from the racial categories and assigns them to a separate category. Hispanics/Latinos may be of any race.
Race / Ethnicity	Pop 2010	Pop 2020	% 2010	% 2020
White alone (NH)	6,008	5,587	63.13%	58.92%
Black or African American alone (NH)	628	621	6.60%	6.55%
Native American or Alaska Native alone (NH)	80	22	0.84%	0.23%
Asian alone (NH)	347	293	3.65%	3.09%
Pacific Islander alone (NH)	66	89	0.69%	0.94%
Some Other Race alone (NH)	21	98	0.22%	1.03%
Mixed Race/Multi-Racial (NH)	477	389	5.01%	4.10%
Hispanic or Latino (any race)	1,890	2,384	19.86%	25.14%
Total	9,517	9,483	100.00%	100.00%

=== 2000 Census ===
As of the 2000 census, there were 11,827 people, 2,332 households, and 2,283 families residing on the base. The population density was 2,696.2 people per square mile (1,041.0 people/km^{2}). There were 2,388 housing units at an average density of 544.4 per square mile (210.2/km^{2}). The racial makeup of the base was 66.6% White, 12.1% African American, 1.1% Native American, 5.3% Asian, 1.2% Pacific Islander, 7.6% from other races, and 6.1% from two or more races. 14.6% of the population were Hispanic or Latino of any race. For every 100 women, there were 202.6 men. For every 100 women age 18 and over, there were 258.8 men. The median income for a household on the base was $34,757.

== Education ==
The Hawaii Department of Education operates Mokapu Elementary School on the MCBH property which goes from kindergarten to 6th grade. As of 2020 its enrollment was about 900.

== Renewable energy and "green" initiatives ==
Since 2004, MCBH has partnered with Ocean Power Technologies to test the generation of electric power from ocean waves using a "PowerBuoy" wave energy converter, one of the first wave power projects in the U.S.

The Azura wave power device is currently being tested in a 30-meter site at the base.

Marine Corps Base Hawaii, under commanding officer Col. Robert Rice, installed solar water heaters on all base housing units, and on 8 December 2010, was scheduled to debut a "Net Zero" sustainable energy home, which uses solar power. The base fleet of government vehicles is also being changed over to hybrid and electric vehicles and most other "FlexFuel" vehicles now operate on E85 ethanol-based fuel. MCB Hawaii installed the first E85 pump in the state of Hawaii in November 2010, the first U.S. military installation in the world to do so.

== See also ==
- 16th Coast Artillery (United States)
- List of United States Marine Corps installations
- U.S. Army Coast Artillery Corps
