= Aquaculture in Nauru =

Aquaculture in Nauru has been practiced much longer than aquaculture in any other Pacific Islands country, with the country's milkfish industry predating contact with Europe. The only area in Nauru deemed capable of supporting aquaculture by the Food and Agriculture Organization of the United Nations is Buada Lagoon.
