= Mokoliʻi =

Islet near Oʻahu, Hawaii

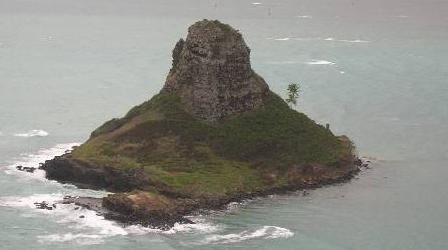

- Location within Oahu Location within Hawaii

Geography
- Location: Oʻahu, Hawaii
- Coordinates: 21.5092°N 157.8297°W
- Area: 12.5 acres (5.1 ha)
- Highest elevation: 206 ft (62.8 m)

Administration
- United States

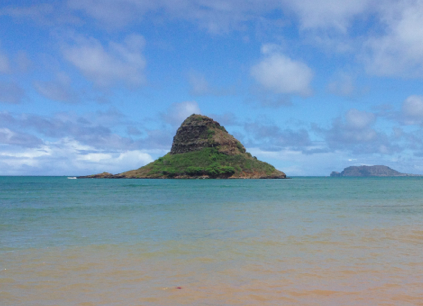
Mokoli'i

Mokoliʻi (Hawaiian pronunciation: [mokoˈliʔi]), also known as Chinaman's Hat, is a basalt islet in Kāneʻohe Bay, Hawaii. Mokoliʻi is part of Kualoa Regional Park and located a third of a mile (0.54 km) offshore of Kualoa Point, Oahu. The 12.5-acre (5.1 ha) islet was at one time part of a basaltic ridge on Oahu before marine erosion separated it.

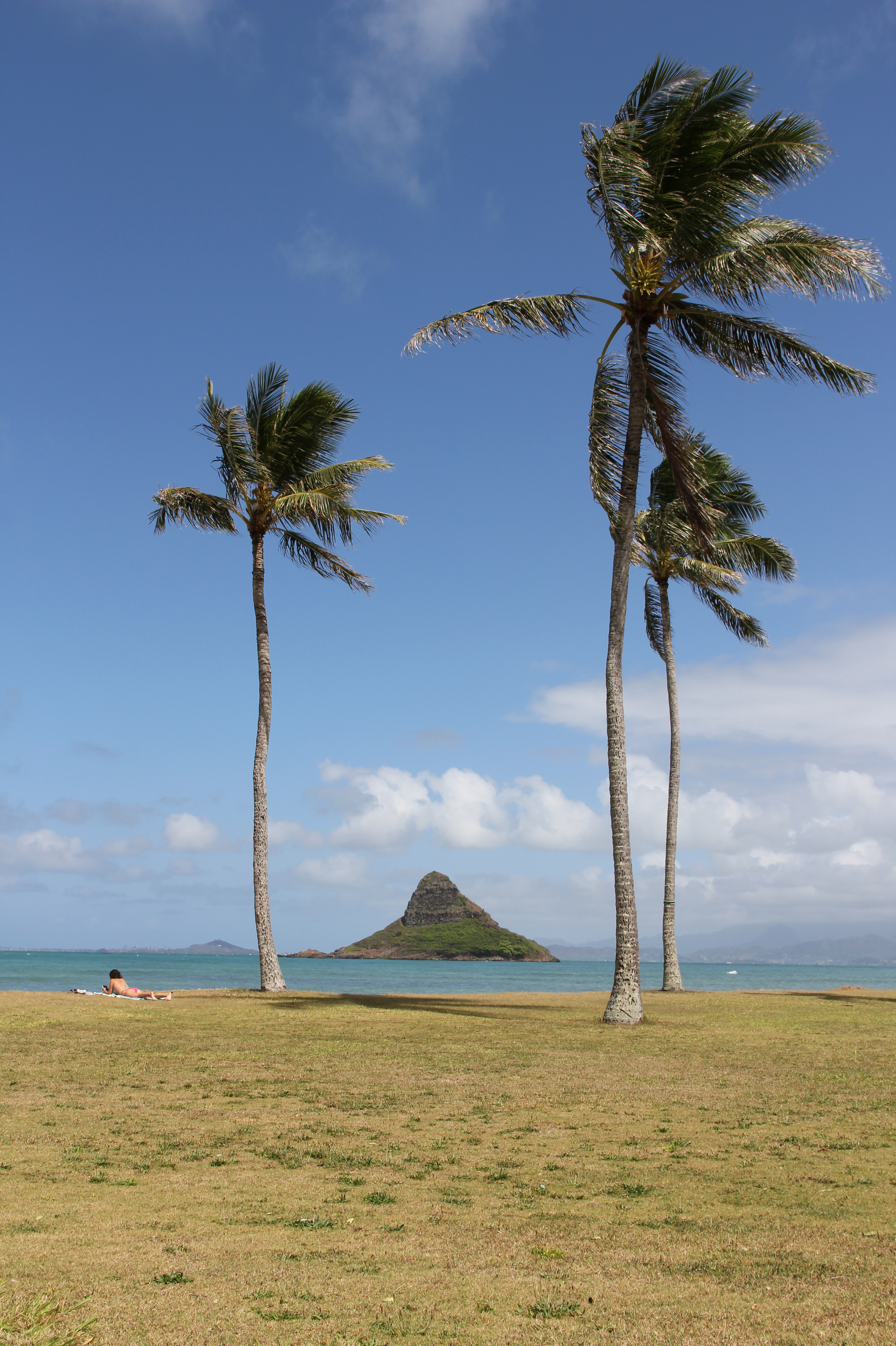
Mokoliʻi as seen from the shore of Kualoa Beach Park

== Etymology ==
Mokoliʻi is Hawaiian for 'little lizard'. Moko is an older form of the word moʻo meaning 'lizard' or 'dragon-like creature'; liʻi means 'small' or 'tiny'. According to the Pele epic in Hawaiian mythology, while the goddess Hiʻiaka was traveling to retrieve Pele's lover, Hiʻiaka killed an evil giant lizard at Kuala. Part of its body fell into the bay and became Mokoliʻi: the island is the tip of the tail sticking out of the water. The closest land on the main island is Hakipuʻu, which bears the broken spine of the lizard, with haki meaning 'to break' or 'broken' and puʻu meaning 'hill' or 'back'.

The common colloquial name, Chinaman's Hat, derives from a comparison of its shape to the Asian conical hat. Of this alternative name, scholar kuʻualoha hoʻomanawanui has written: "It completely erases the Native perspective of the ʻāina as moʻo, a living entity that Hiʻiaka—a female, no less—overpowers [...] Mokoliʻi doesn't exist in isolation as 'Chinaman's Hat' does." A resolution was introduced at the Hawaii State Legislature in 2007, requesting that the Hawaii Tourism Authority discourage the use of the name "Chinaman's Hat" in favor of Mokoliʻi, noting that the name "Chinaman's Hat" "has no historical or cultural significance" and "is offensive to many people of Chinese ancestry". The resolution did not pass the legislature.

== Flora and fauna ==
Both wildlife and plants of Mokoliʻi have been affected by the presence of non-native species, in particular the black rat and yellow crazy ant. Although other species of birds previously nested there, the wedge-tailed shearwater is the only species of bird that nests on Mokoliʻi. Seventy-two species of plants have been identified, the majority of which are invasive non-native species. Native plants thrive in the coastal margins and include ahu awa (Cyperus javanicus), naupaka (Scaevola taccada), and ilima (Sida fallax). Invasive plants which dominate the slopes are Lantana camara, Spanish needles (Bidens alba var. radiata), and christmasberry. The island was designated as a critical habitat for Carter's panicgrass (Panicum fauriei var. carteri) by the U.S. Fish and Wildlife Service (USFWS) in 1983. In 2002, the USFWS initiated a program to eradicate rats from Mokoliʻi.

== History ==
The U.S. Exploring Expedition of 1840 drew up a chart of Kaneohe Bay Harbor where it labeled Mokoliʻi as "Namu Island".

Mokoliʻi was under private ownership until the 1970s, when the City and County of Honolulu purchased it.

== Access ==
Mokoliʻi is owned by the City and County of Honolulu and is protected by state and federal park regulations. It is open to the public from dawn to dusk. It can be accessed by kayak, boat, surfboard, or by swimming, or wading at low tide. There is also a 20-minute hike to the top of the island.
