= Buada Lagoon =

Freshwater lake in Buada district, Nauru

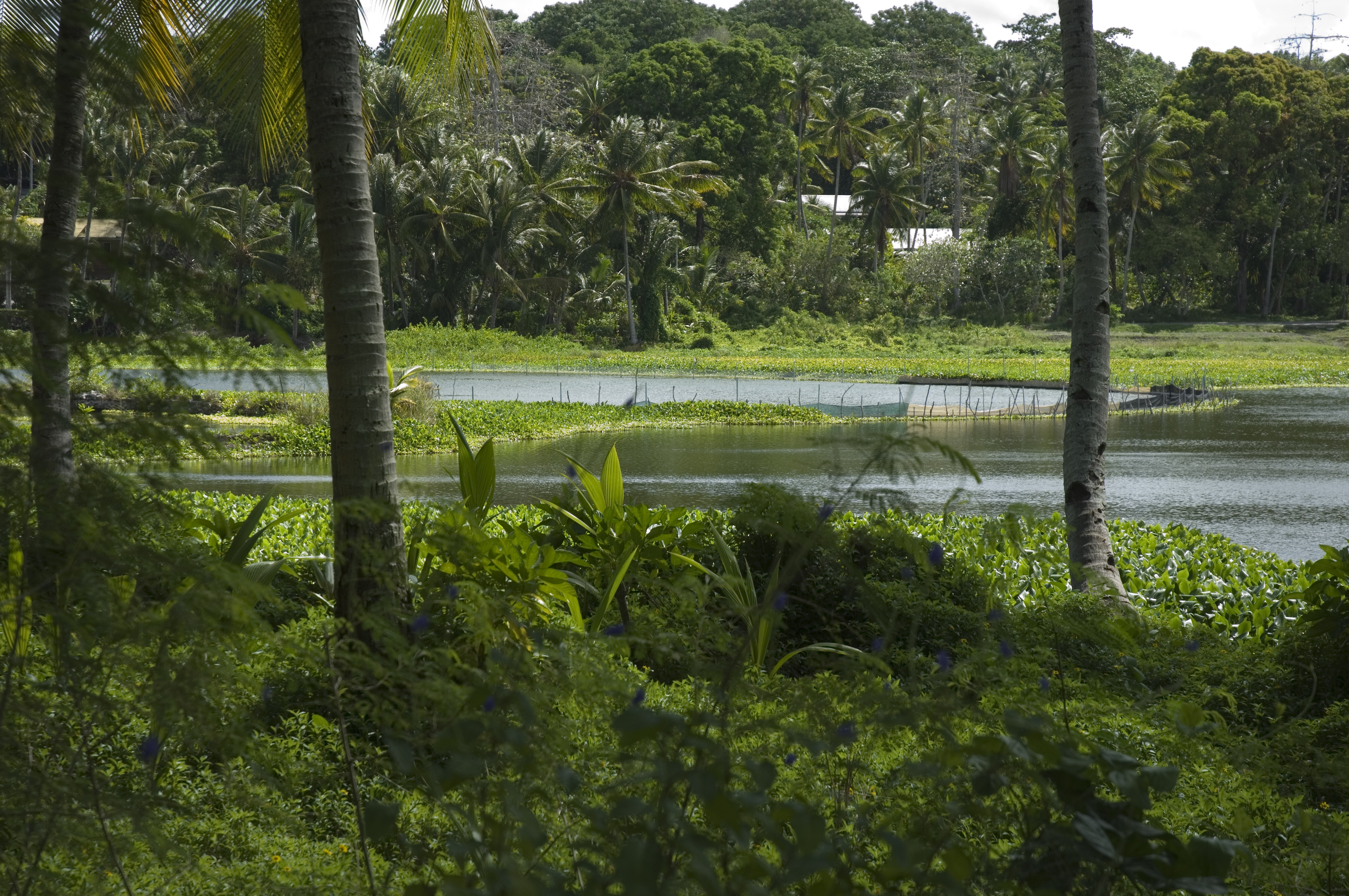
- Buada Lagoon

- Location within Nauru
- Location: Buada district, Nauru
- Coordinates: 0°32′7″S 166°55′20″E
- Type: lake
- Surface area: 3.8 ha (9.4 acres)
- Max. depth: 5 m (16 ft)

Buada Lagoon is a landlocked, slightly brackish, freshwater lake of Buada district in the island nation of Nauru. It occupies 3.8 ha (9.4 acres) with a depth of up to 2m after an extended rainfall.

The lagoon is classified as an endorheic lake, meaning there is no outflow to other bodies of water such as oceans or rivers.

The Buada Lagoon is the biggest and only true lake in Nauru, a small island nation in Oceania consisting of a flat island of 21.3 km^{2} (8.2 sq mi) in area. It is not a lagoon as such, in that the lake is not joined to the sea, but its water is slightly brackish.

Freshwater is rare in Nauru, being present only in the form of a small phreatic zone, the Moqua Well (a small underground lake) and the Buada Lagoon, which is the most visible, rivers and streams being utterly absent from the country.

The lake has traditionally been used for pisciculture, which saw the raising of milkfish for human consumption through the centuries, and even though this practice was given up in the 1960s, it has lately seen efforts to revive it, despite the lagoon's water pollution.

== Geography ==
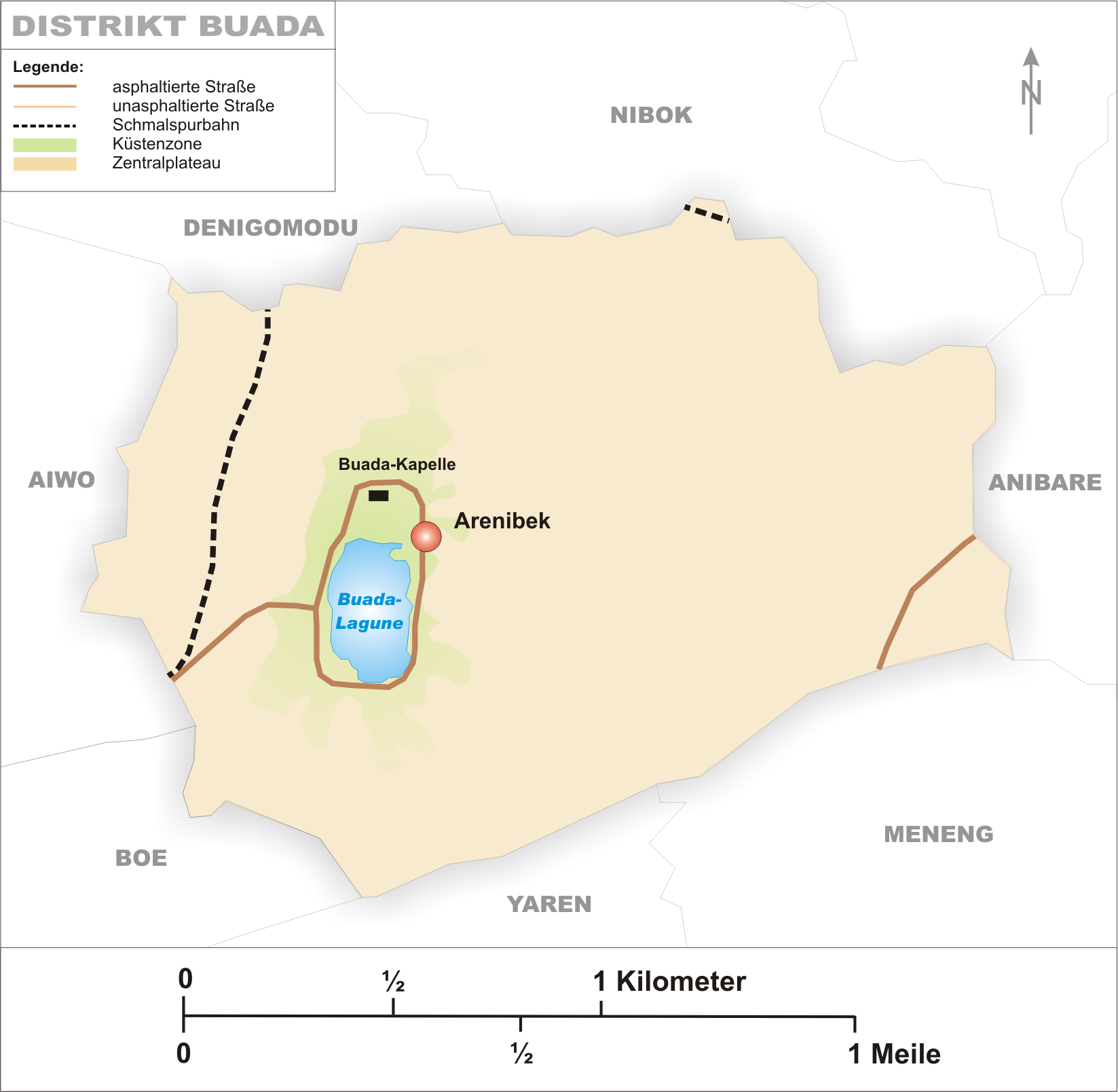
Map of Buada District.

=== Geology and hydrology ===
The Buada Lagoon, which is found in the southwest of the plateau that spreads over most of the central part of the island of Nauru, lies in the middle of a swampy depression of 12 hectares.

This karstic bowl, dominated in the northwest by Command Ridge, the island's highest point, came about as a result of sagging of the ground, itself arising from dissolving coral limestone, the mineral that makes up a great part of the plateau's rocks in the form of pinnacles, among which phosphate ore, of a high level of purity, is found. The lagoon's basin, though, is the only region of the plateau where the ore, which was the mainstay of Nauru's economy through the 20th century, was never exploited.

Oval in shape, with a length of roughly 280 m along a north-south axis and a width of about 140 m, and lying some 1,300 m from the seashore, the Buada Lagoon is shallow, with a depth of one or two metres on average, reaching five metres at its deepest, and its average surface level is near sea level. However, the lake's levels can vary considerable as a result of the Buada Lagoon's endoreic state; it has no outlet and is fed only by rainwater, there being no rivers at all in Nauru. Thus, between the monsoon season from November to February, when most of the rain falls (this is on average some 2,126 mm each year) and the dry season, especially in years when La Niña is present, the low-water level can sink as far down as five metres below sea level.

The lake's greenish waters are slightly brackish, with a salt concentration of two percent, and slightly basic with a pH of 8.

=== Flora ===
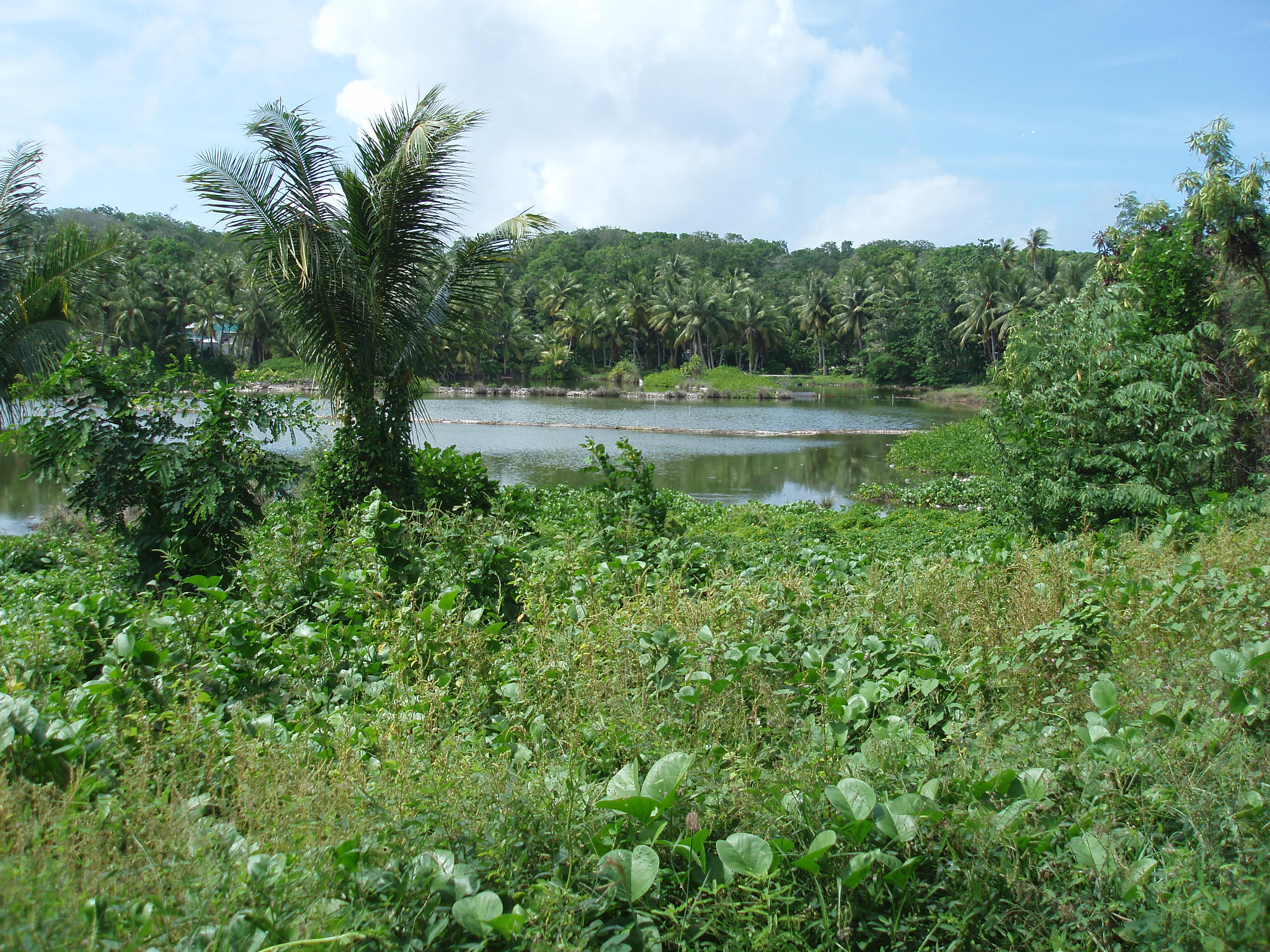
Vegetation on the Lagoon's shore

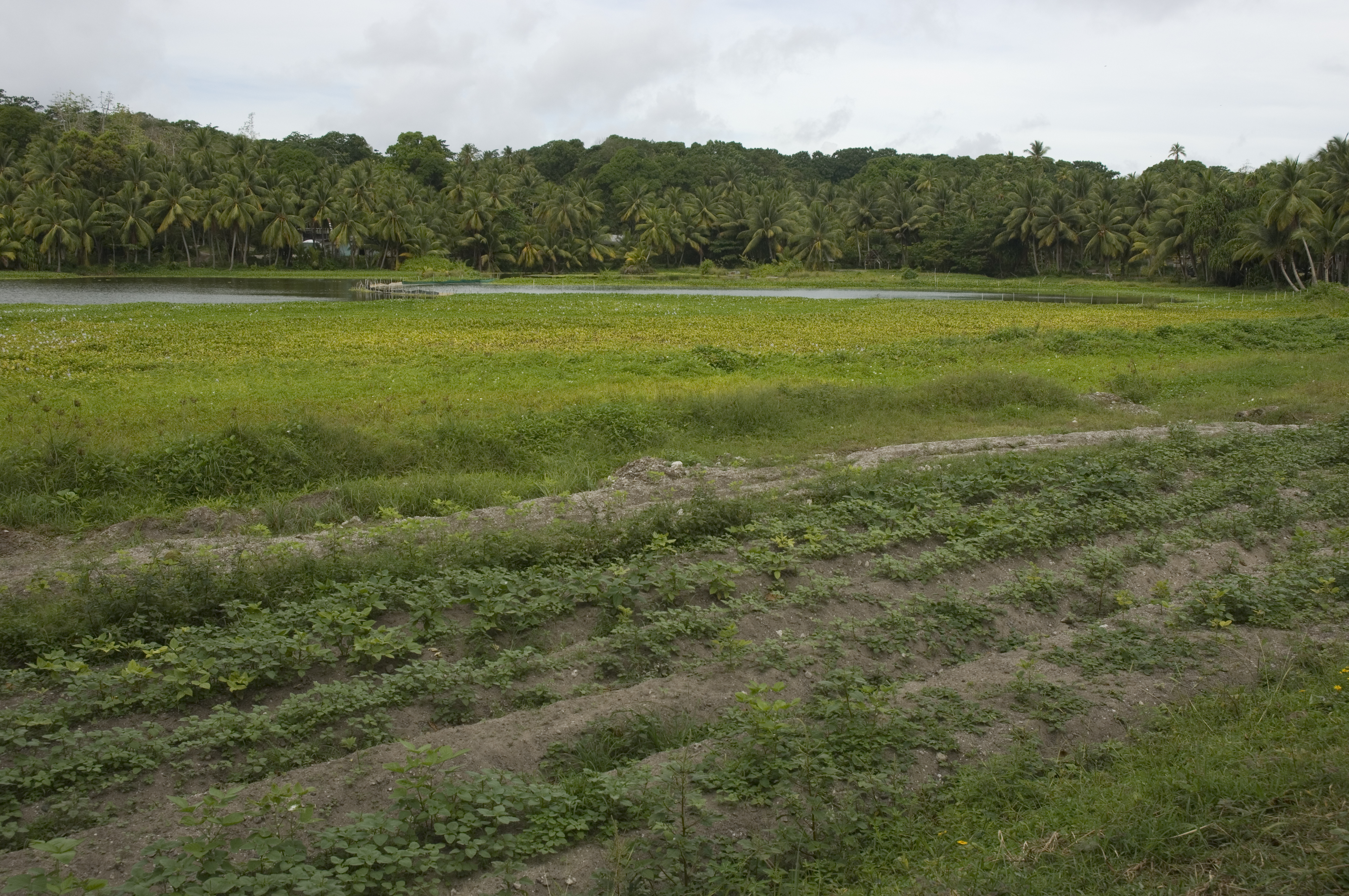
Vegetable garden by the lagoon, 2007

Very little information is available about the Buada Lagoon's lacustrine flora, However, the presence of the invasive water hyacinth, Eichhornia crassipes (now Pontederia crassipes), which chokes waterways and promotes flooding, has been confirmed. In 1993, it was reported as a "recent introduction", still "rare" at that time.

The vegetation along the lake's edge to a great extent represents a relic of the tropical forest that occupied 90 per cent of the island before the phosphate ore began to be exploited in the 20th century. Covering 40 hectares (99 acres) and growing on a fertile, waterlogged soil, it is made up mostly of tamanu (Calophyllum inophyllum) along with a few Rubiaceae like Guettarda speciosa. There is also:

- Adenanthera pavonina
- Ceiba pentandra or 'kapok' trees
- coconut
- mango
- Mimosa pudica
- Premna serratifolia
- sea mango
- Terminalia catappa (the 'tropical almond', or in Nauruan: etetah, etetö)

The undergrowth is mainly made up of:

- hopbush
- ferns like
  - monarch fern
  - giant swordfern
- Morinda citrifolia, or "noni"
- Physalis angulata
- Scaevola
  - notably, Scaevola taccada

There are parasitic plants like Cassytha filiformis, or Psilotum nudum. Glochidion societatis is found in open areas while Cyperus (specifically Cyperus javanicus and Cyperus compressus, species close to papyrus), Portulaca oleracea and Ipomoea aquatica are found in the wetlands, much of which was destroyed during the Japanese Occupation during the Second World War. Further, exotic plants such as guava, lantana, Grona triflora and Chamaesyce hirta have colonized places that have experienced disturbances.

Within this forest, on small parcels of land, are grown fruit trees, such as pandan, breadfruit, banana, mango, guava and soursop, as well as vegetables, such as cabbage and bitter melon for consumption. Also grown are ylang-ylang, Cassia grandis, Crotalaria spectabilis, Samanea saman, seagrape and, for ornamentation, some Asteraceae such as Ageratum conyzoides and Synedrella nodiflora.

=== Fauna ===
==== Insects ====
The lagoon's depression is one place on Nauru where insects proliferate, mostly because of the nearby expanses of stagnant freshwater such as the Buada Lagoon itself and also the rainwater cisterns found at dwellings and farms.

Thus, three species of mosquito, Culex quinquefasciatus, Culex sitiens and Aedes aegypti, proliferate in the monsoon season from November to February near expanses of stagnant freshwater like household rainwater cisterns, used tires, wells and, of course, the Buada Lagoon, albeit only slightly more seriously than towards the seashore. These mosquitos, beyond simply being an annoyance to the local populace at dawn, also carry a parasitic illness, filariasis, although the incidence among the local people is not high. The only two predators that feed on these mosquitos are fishes, the milkfish and the gambusia, which feed themselves on the larvae, as well as two species of Odonata.

Three species of fruit flies, the oriental fruit fly, the Pacific fruit fly and the mango fly, were present before the 2000s and caused considerable damage to farms. The lands around the Buada Lagoon have been affected by these flies, who have found a breeding ground in the many fruit trees grown there. The flies have also been the object of eradication efforts, some of which have met with success, such as the one against the oriental fruit fly, which was eliminated in 1999.

==== Birds ====
Birds, particularly seabirds, are Nauru's most visible animals, and some stop there in great numbers during their migration or for nesting.

Only one bird species, the Nauru reed warbler, is endemic, but it is threatened with extinction by habitat destruction, even though it has been colonising areas recently reforested now that phosphate deposits are no longer being exploited on the island's plateau. This species likes shrubby areas in the tropical rainforest, farms and gardens, including the area around Buada Lagoon, which are associated with those three habitats.

==== Fish ====
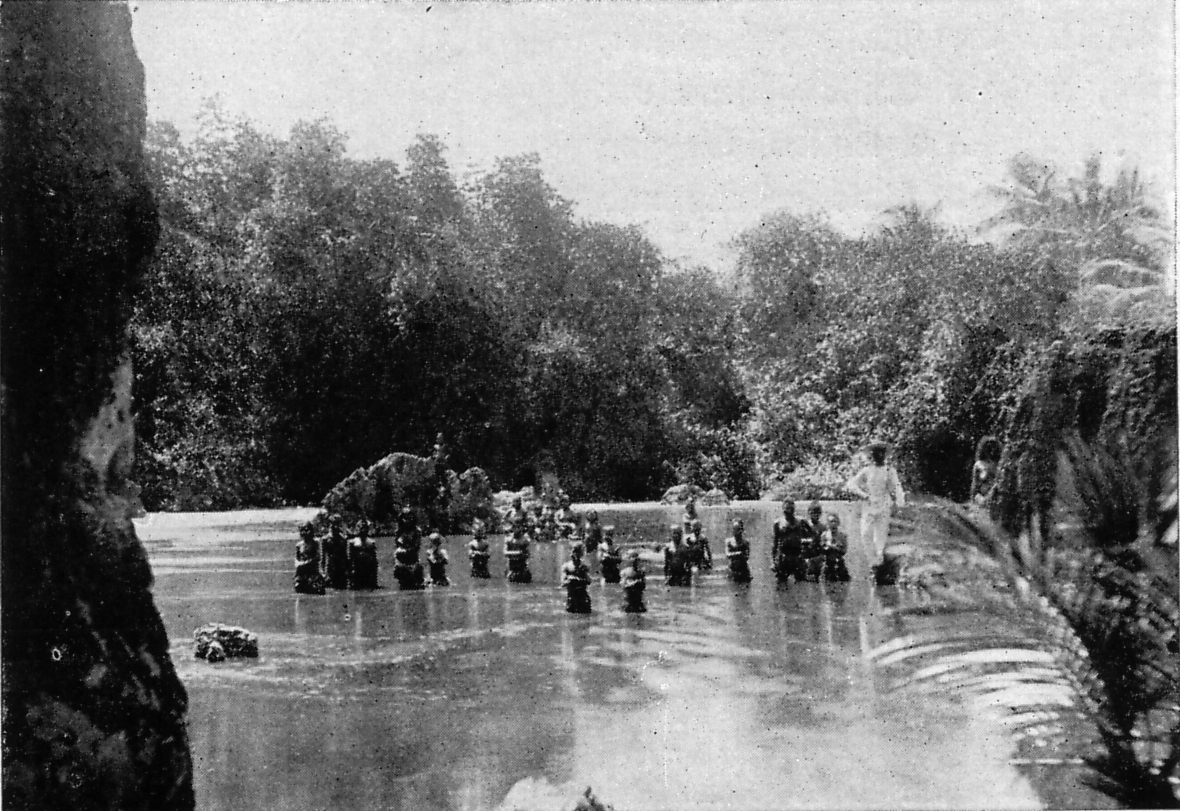
Fishing on the Buada Lagoon in 1938.

Three fish species are found in the Buada Lagoon: milkfish, Mozambique tilapia and gambusia, those last two having been introduced to Nauru, the tilapia to afford the local people a new food source, and the gambusia to help eradicate mosquitos.

In certain years, Nauruans traditionally practised pisciculture by catching milkfish in the island's inshore waters (by some definitions, the actual lagoon, just behind the offshore coral reefs) and releasing them into the Buada Lagoon and another such body of water at Anabar. Indeed, the fish thus raised have long been considered a high-quality food by the Nauruans for being so rich in fat. Fish farming therefore stood as a social organiser between different tribes: the exploitation was shared by tribes by using low walls, looking after the fish was trusted to men who regularly waded in the waters to keep them oxygenated and filled with nutrients, and children were forbidden to bother the fish when they bathed in the waters.

About 1960, Mozambique tilapias were introduced into the Buada Lagoon in the hopes of getting pisciculture going again and limiting the invasion of mosquitos. Unfortunately, the tilapias multiplied to such an extent that they presented some serious competition to the milkfish being raised in the lagoon, with no milkfish ever reaching a size suitable for harvest, that being some 20 cm (7.9 in) long. This led many fish farmers to give up the trade, as the tilapias themselves were not very good to eat.

To set this ecological blunder right, a number of attempts were made, some meeting with no success, and others even worsening an already bad situation. So the Food and Agriculture Organization of the United Nations (FAO), at Nauru's request, from 1979 and 1980 put in place a programme to reduce the tilapia population. This programme entailed spreading rotenone on the lake's surface; this is a highly toxic molecule, particularly to fish, and dangerous to humans, but also biodegradable. The lake was thus temporarily poisoned.

In 1991, the FAO's "South Pacific Aquaculture Development Project" (SPADP) showed that it was possible that the milkfish and the tilapia could coexist in fish farming. The FAO thus introduced in 1998 Nile tilapias into the Buada Lagoon, an experiment much like one carried out in Fiji that had been able to show the Nile species possessed qualities that better appealed to local people's tastes. This meant that pisciculture might be revived in Nauru. At the same time, a Taiwanese project also sought to revive fish farming by using intensive methods of raising fish, but these were nevertheless both given up for want of funds.

The failure of these attempts to get the fish farming industry running again then led to the establishment in 2001 of a semi-intensive aquaculture programme, also Taiwanese, which involved building concrete basins 20 by 10 by 1.5 metres (65.6 ft × 32.8 ft × 4.9 ft). These were equipped with oxygenators, nets and specially adapted feeding. The idea was to allow fish farmers to raise milkfish using seawater, and without having to share the water with tilapias.

== Human presence ==
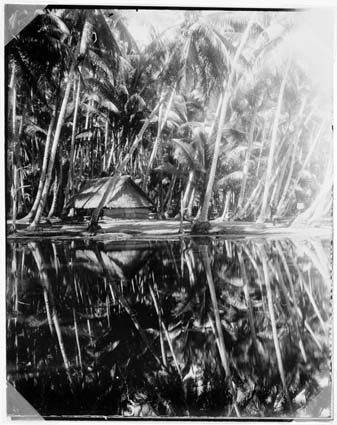
Buada lagoon in 1908

Buada Lagoon, Nauru's only inhabited inland area, with some 660 inhabitants living around it, lies in the centre-west of Buada district. Girded by a road, the lakeshore is made up of private residential properties where fruit trees are grown, such as pandan, breadfruit, banana, mango, guava and soursop, and along with those such vegetables as cabbage and bitter melon. These households together form the community of Arenibek.

Since the island's sewage treatment and household waste collection are not very efficient, the lake becomes polluted with both sewage and rubbish from the shore residents, which leads to contamination from Escherichia coli. Despite these threats of environmental degradation, no protective measures are being undertaken, even though Buada Lagoon would seem to meet the criteria of the Ramsar Convention on Wetlands of International Importance. However, Nauru is not a signatory to that treaty.

== See also ==
- Endorheic lake
- Geography of Nauru
- Moqua Well
- Pisciculture
- Buada District
- Districts of Nauru
- Early history of Nauru
