= Arenibek =

- Village
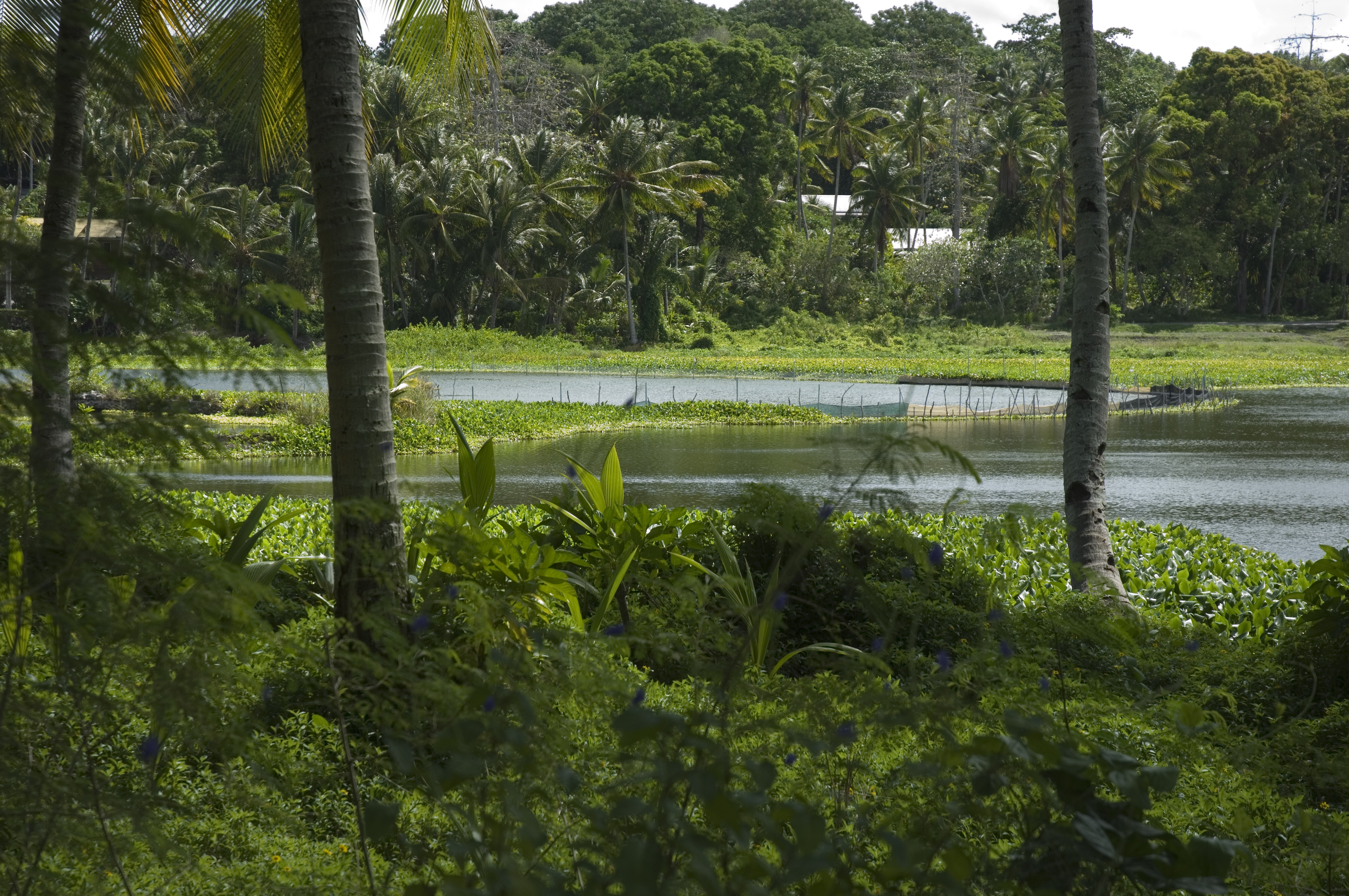
- Arenibek by the Buada Lagoon
- Interactive map of Arenibek
- Coordinates: 0°32′S 166°55′E
- Country: Nauru
- District: Buada

Arenibek is a village in Buada, Nauru, around the Buada Lagoon, which forms a depression within the plateau.

The population (estimated at 673 inhabitants in 2002) is distributed there along a road which surrounds the Buada Lagoon, itself connected to Island Ring Road, Nauru's main road. There is a Protestant temple there.
