= Wave Hub =

- Location of the Wave Hub off the coast of Cornwall
- Country: United Kingdom
- Location: off Hayle, Cornwall
- Coordinates: 50°18′40″N 5°31′30″W
- Status: Under construction
- Commission date: 2010
- Construction cost: £28 million
- Owner: Hexicon
- Operator: Wave Hub Limited

Wave power station
- Distance from shore: 10 mi (16 km)

Power generation
- Nameplate capacity: 20 MW

The Wave Hub is an offshore renewable energy research project, originally developed for wave power, but following limited interest is being developed for floating offshore wind. The project is developed approximately 10 miles (16 km) off Hayle, on the north coast of Cornwall, United Kingdom.

The hub was installed on the seabed in September 2010, and is a 'socket' sitting on the seabed for devices to be plugged into. It was originally envisaged to have connections to it from arrays of up to four kinds of wave energy converter. A cable from the hub to main land will take electrical power from the devices to the electric grid. The total capacity of the hub will be 20 MWe. The estimated cost of the project is £28 million.

== Developers ==
The project was originally developed by the South West of England Regional Development Agency (SWRDA). Ownership transferred to the Department for Business, Innovation and Skills (BIS) on 1 January 2012 in advance of the abolition of SWRDA on 31 March 2012. BIS created an operating company, Wave Hub Limited, to manage the project on its behalf.

The concept anticipated a total of four device developers connecting their arrays into the Wave Hub. This would have allowed the developers to transmit and sell their renewable electricity to the UK's electricity distribution grid (although as there was no mechanism for metering individual device arrays it remains unclear how this could have been managed). Each developer will be able to locate their devices in one quarter of the 3 by 1 kilometre (1.86 by 0.62 mi) rectangle allocated to the Wave Hub. A sub-sea transformer will be provided with capacity to deliver up to a total of 20 MW of power into the local distribution network.

In 2006 three companies were signed on for initial development. The initial partners were Ocean Power Technologies Limited, Fred Olsen Limited and Ocean Prospect. All subsequently withdrew.

By 2015 Wave Hub Ltd announced planned deployments to their four Wave Hub sites. to be assigned to wave generators from UK-based Seatricity, the Australian company Carnegie Wave Energy Limited and Finnish Fortum. The fourth site is to be used for testing offshore floating wind generators.

=== Hexicon TwinHub ===
In 2016 ownership of Wave Hub was transferred from BIS to Cornwall Council as part of a devolution deal. Wave Hub Development Services Ltd became known as Celtic Sea Power in 2021, before its sale to Hexicon, a Swedish floating windfarm developer. The name was changed "... to better reflect its future role, which includes attracting large scale floating wind projects ...". Hexicon plan to use the wavehub site for TwinHub, a 30–40MW floating offshore wind project.

In July 2022, the project was awarded market support through the UK Contracts for Difference (CfD) scheme at £87.30/MWh (in 2012 prices) for a 32 MW project. This was the first floating wind project to be awarded a CfD.

Since early 2024, the developer Hexicon has been looking to divest the project to another company looking to enter the floating offshore wind market, without success. In January 2026, Hexicon wrote off SEK 115 million (EUR 10.9m) of capitalised intangible assets and goodwill linked to the TwinHub project; high inflation and supply chain costs were cited as the reason.

In March 2026, the Low Carbon Contracts Company terminated the CfD for the project.

== Description ==
The project was financed by the South West of England Regional Development Agency (£12.5 million), the European Regional Development Fund Convergence Programme (£20 million) and the UK government (£9.5 million).

Wave Hub could generate £76 million over 25 years for the regional economy. It would create at least 170 jobs and possibly hundreds more by creating a new wave power industry in South West England. Wave Hub could save 24,300 tonnes of carbon dioxide every year when displacing fossil fuels. This would support South West England's target for generating 15% of the region's power from renewable sources by 2010.

== Installation ==
The first and, to date, only device to be associated with the Wave Hub was Seatricity's Oceanus 2 device, which was first moored there in June 2014. The Seatricity device does not produce electricity directly, but is designed to pump water under pressure several miles along a pipeline back to the shore to drive a turbine. Although the Wave Hub site was too far offshore for this ever to be a practical reality, Seatricity was able to take advantage of Wave Hub's licence to operate wave energy devices at that location for initial trials.

Over a three-year period, Seatricity's device was deployed for three separate summer trial windows – each funded entirely by the company's investors and contracted for on Wave Hub Ltd's commercial leasehold terms. Each lease was severely time limited by the tenure Wave Hub would permit the company to remain on the site (not least because Wave Hub Ltd were, at the time, [over-]optimistically courting the seemingly better funded Wello Oy and Carnegie projects and wanted the prime site close to the Wave Hub on the seabed they had previously allocated to Seatricity for one of those two more major projects). Wave Hub Ltd ostensibly attributed the limitation of Seatricity's length of tenure, in part, to the maximum tenure granted by the Marine Management Organisation (MMO) site license, which the MMO attributed to the length of lease the Crown Estate would grant to Seatricity; as advised by their specialist advisers, Wave Hub Ltd. This cyclic uncertainty was exacerbated repeatedly by Wave Hub Ltd's pressure on Seatricity to vacate their allocated site at the end of each successive trial period because the location was 'needed for other clients' (who, of course, ultimately never materialised). The net consequence meant that Seatricity was constantly being required to anticipate and plan for decommissioning when they could and should have been being encouraged to plan for the next steps. Meanwhile, Wave Hub Ltd campaigned and worked to generate public and other grant funding for the clients they didn't have (and never got) whilst simultaneously charging for, and depleting Seatricity's private equity funding resource. During each trial the company accumulated data on the promising potential and pressures achieved by their pumping system, but it was never connected to the shore; and nor could it have been from a site so far offshore. Trials were brought to an abrupt halt when the tether broke in 11m waves on a par with those experienced during winter storms during a summer gale on the night of 19 Aug 2016, close to the end of Seatricity's final licence period. The final irony came when later research and RoV site inspection showed that a combination of the swell pattern and the Wave Hub sites circular tidal cycle had 'wound up' the secondary reserve safety moorings around the Oceanus 2 device's main tether in the style of a Spanish windlass – thereby putting each under enormous loads and leading to their eventual failure. Without the complexity and subsequent interaction of the risk averse Wave Hub Ltd's mandated and superfluous secondary moorings, the device and its tether would have survived and operated unscathed. The Oceanus 2 device was recovered intact to Falmouth but the company's relationship and frustrations with Wave Hub Ltd proved irreconcilable.

In March 2018 it was announced that the Australian wave energy company Carnegie had cancelled its plans to test a wave-energy device at the Wave Hub. An American company, Gwave, was due to install a device later in 2018, but that too has been postponed. By March 2018, no electricity had been produced at the Wave Hub.
