= Ocean Power Technologies =

American renewable energy company

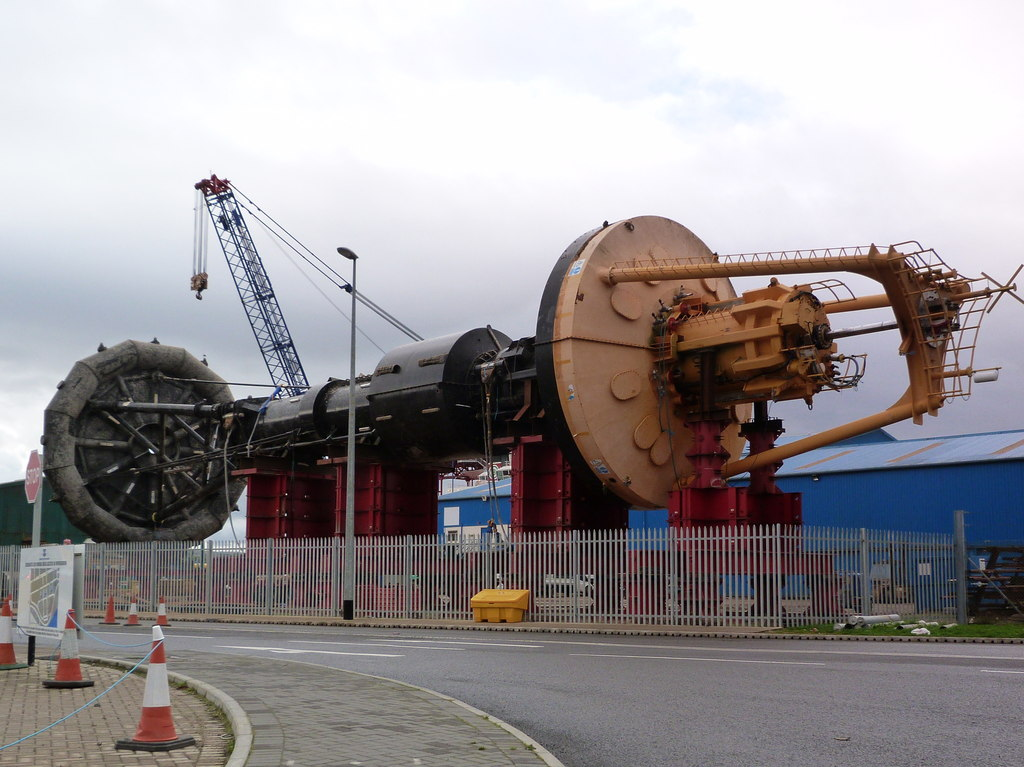
- PB150 wave-power generator
- Company type: Public
- Traded as: AMEX: OPTT
- Industry: Renewable Energy, Wave Power, Sustainable Energy
- Founded: Princeton, New Jersey, United States (1984)
- Founder: George W. Taylor; Joseph R. Burns
- Headquarters: Monroe, New Jersey, United States
- Area served: Worldwide
- Key people: Terence J. Cryan (chairman); George H. Kirby (President and CEO)
- Website: (1999 established)

Ocean Power Technologies (OPT) is a U.S. publicly owned renewable energy company, providing electric power and communications solutions, services and related for remote offshore applications. The company's PowerBuoy wave energy conversion technology is theoretically scalable to hundreds of megawatts and the generated energy from wave power can be supplied to the grid via submarine cables. Several projects were undertaken around the world, but the economic viability of the theoretical concept has been problematic.

Ocean Power was involved in several large PowerBuoy projects, including a very large Australian project with Lockheed Martin from 2012–2014, when they determined that "the project wasn’t 'commercially viable,' and [the company] changed its strategy. It has since commercialized the technology by providing power and communications to remote sites such as offshore oil fields."

Ocean Power Technologies Australasia Pty Ltd, OPTA is an Australian-owned subsidiary of Ocean Power Technologies Inc (OPT), previously engaged in wave power projects in Australia. Ocean Power Technologies Limited is the UK-based wholly owned subsidiary.

== Range of products ==
- Devices for the Grid-connected utility market, currently the Mark 3 PowerBuoy.
- Devices for the Autonomous market requiring lower levels of power for deep-ocean applications such as maritime security and homeland defense, offshore oil and gas operations, aquaculture and oceanographic data sampling. The company’s PowerBuoy in ratings of 2 kilowatt to 40 kilowatt is ideal for these applications, including the LEAP autonomous PowerBuoy sold to the US Navy.
- Infrastructure products and services - cable installations, grid interconnection, permitting and site development, including the company’s Undersea Substation Pod product, available to all companies in the marine energy sector.
- Undersea Substation Pod - Device for aggregating diverse power generation devices and supplying an interface with onshore power distribution.

== Projects ==
=== Projects ===
1. LEAP Autonomous PowerBuoy, New Jersey, USA - O.P.T. has successfully operated a system off New Jersey, designed and manufactured by O.P.T. under the US Navy’s Littoral Expeditionary Autonomous PowerBuoy (LEAP) program for coastal security and maritime surveillance.
2. Coos Bay, Oregon, USA - O.P.T. has proposed a utility-scale, commercial wave park in North America at Coos Bay, Oregon. The planned size of this park is up to 100 megawatts, and it will be the largest wave energy project in the world when completed.
3. Reedsport, Oregon, USA - O.P.T. is developing a commercial wave park on the west coast of the United States located 2.5 miles offshore near Reedsport, Oregon. The first phase of this project is for ten PB150 PowerBuoys, or 1.5 megawatts. Due to legal and technical problems, this project has now ground to a halt, August 2013.
4. Santoña, Spain - In July 2006, O.P.T. formed a joint venture with Iberdrola S.A., global oil major TOTAL, the Spanish Government IDAE (Institute of Energy Savings and Efficiency), and the local regional development agency SODERCAN, for the turnkey construction of a wave farm off the North coast of Spain. OPT has been awarded funding by the European Union to deploy a PowerBuoy at the Santoña site developed by the joint venture.
5. Cornwall, England, UK - O.P.T. aims to develop its wave power generation technology at Wave Hub, a renewable energy project off Cornwall in the South West of England, expected to create the UK's first offshore facility for the demonstration and proving of arrays of wave energy generation devices. In 2018 Wave Hub plans to diversify to wind power, as wave projects have been shelved, though Marine Power Systems was testing a generator in 2017, which was put in place in 2018.
6. Portland, Victoria, Australia - Ocean Power Technologies Australasia Pty Ltd, as part of Victorian Wave Partners is developing a 19 megawatts wave power station connected to the grid near Portland, Victoria. The project has an offer of an AU$66.46 million grant from the Federal Government of Australia.

=== Completed ===
1. Scotland - An O.P.T. wave power generation buoy was successfully deployed at sea in 2011 by a team including Scotland-based Global Maritime Scotland Ltd, Port Services (Invergordon) Ltd and OPT, with the support of the Cromarty Firth Port Authority.
2. Oahu, Hawaii - From 2009 to 2011, O.P.T. ocean-tested its wave power generation system at the US Marine Corps Base Hawaii (MCBH) at Kaneohe Bay. The Oahu system was launched under the company's program with the US Navy for ocean testing and demonstration of such systems, including connection to the Oahu grid.
3. Atlantic City, New Jersey - The principles demonstrated with the earlier prototype power generation buoys, deployed and tested off the coast of Atlantic City, were integrated into the designs of the buoys for Hawaii and Spain.

== Technology ==
=== PowerBuoy ===
The company's primary product is the PowerBuoy wave generation system. It uses a "smart," oceangoing buoy to capture and convert wave energy into low-cost, clean electricity.

=== Hybrid PowerBuoy ===
The company's secondary product, the Hybrid PowerBuoy, generates energy independent of wave motion, instead relying on a solar panel array for charging the onboard lithium iron phosphate batteries. Backup power is provided by a liquid propane 1 kW engine.

=== Subsea Battery ===
Unlike the energy-generating PowerBuoy and hybrid variant, the Subsea Battery is a fully submersed energy-storage vessel housing lithium-iron phosphate batteries for powering subsea payloads. The batteries supply 132 kWh (nominal capacity) with up to 15 kW peak power delivery.

=== Undersea Substation Pod (USP) ===
The USP is an electrical power aggregator from up to ten offshore power generation devices, be they wind, wave power or other, into one common interconnection point for transmission to the onshore power grid. The USP can likewise be configured to supply onshore power to offshore devices.

== See also ==
- Ocean energy
- Wave farms
- Pelamis Wave Power
