= Ocean Power Technologies Australasia =

Ocean Power Technologies (Australasia) Pty Ltd
- Type: Public
- Traded as: Nasdaq: OPTT
- Industry: Renewable Energy, Wave Power, Sustainable Energy
- Founded: Perth, Western Australia, Australia (1984)
- Founder: Dr. George W. Taylor
- Headquarters: Perth, Western Australia, Australia
- Area served: Australia-wide
- Key people: Dr. George Taylor (Chairman) & (CEO); Gilbert George (Director)); Charles F. Dunleavy (Managing Director)); Keith Bowyer (General Manager))
- Owner: OPT, Inc (88%) + Woodside Petroleum (12%)
- Website: (1999 established)

Ocean Power Technologies Australasia Pty Ltd (OPTA) is an Australian company, a subsidiary of Ocean Power Technologies Inc (OPT) of the United States, a renewable energy company, providing power generation devices, services and related equipment for the extraction of energy from ocean waves.

In 2009 OPTA was part of Victorian Wave Partners formed to develop a 19 megawatt wave power project near Portland, Victoria connected to the grid. The project was to receive an AU$66.46 million grant from the Australia federal government. By 2014, the consortium had abandoned the project, saying it was not commercially viable. OPT had given up on plans to develop the project, which was to cost $232 million for which the Australian government had offered $66.5 million in funding support.

== Media Coverage ==
=== 2012 ===
- Wave Energy Company Finds Its Sea Legs
- "Victoria project - January". smh.com.au.
- Victoria Australia project to add jobs - July
- Ocean Power Technologies and Lockheed Martin take wave power down under - July
- Ocean Power Technologies and Lockheed Martin to Develop Wave-Energy Project in Australia - July
- Innovations In Wave Power: An Interview With Dr. George Taylor - July
- Lockheed Martin, Woodside in wave power project - July
- Oregon wave power project gets green light to go forward - August
- Ocean Power Technologies Receives Federal Approval for the First Commercial Wave Farm in the US - August
- Federal approval for the first commercial wave farm
- Reedsport Development News - September
- OPT To Work With U.S. Department Of Homeland Security - September
- Reedsport Development Update - Deployment in spring 2013 - October
- Alliance with Mitsui Engineering & Shipbuilding-Japan - October
- Herald On-Line: Mitsui Alliance - October
- OPT Contract Awarded by Mitsui - October
- OPT and Mitsui to steer wave device to possible Japan launch - October
- OPT Establishes New Business Unit to Drive Growth - November

== See also ==
- Ocean energy
- Wave power
- Wave farms
