= Kualoa Regional Park =

Park in Oahu, Hawaii

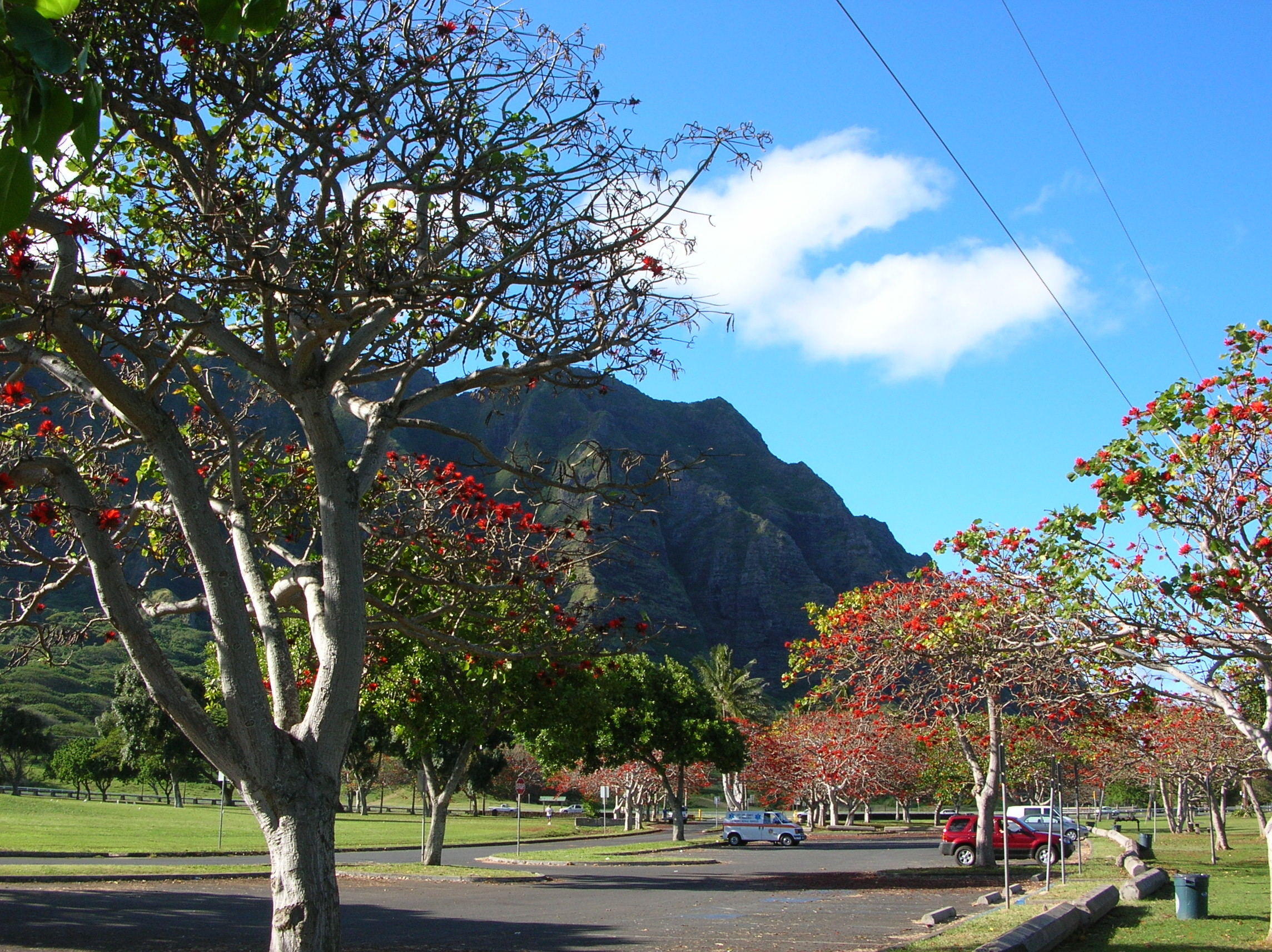
- Interactive map of Kualoa Regional Park
- Location: 49-479 Kamehameha Hwy; Kāneʻohe Bay; Oahu, Hawaii
- Coordinates: 21°30′40″N 157°50′13″W
- Area: 153 acres (61.92 ha; 0.24 sq mi)
- Operator: City and County of Honolulu
- Open: All year
- Website: Kualoa Regional Park

Kualoa Regional Park is located at Kāneʻohe Bay, on the island of Oahu in the U.S. state of Hawaii. The park covers 153 acres (61.92 ha; 0.24 sq mi) across the road from the Pali-ku (cliffs) of the Koʻolau Range. The beach front is white sand and 1/3 mile offshore is the small basalt island of Mokoliʻi (or Chinaman's Hat).

The site is popular with watchers of wetland birds, such as the Japanese white-eye, Red-crested cardinal, White-rumped shama, Black-crowned night heron, Black-necked stilt, Nutmeg mannikin, Black noddy, Wedge-tailed shearwater, White-tailed tropicbird, Red-tailed tropicbird, Common myna, Common waxbill, Cattle egret and a variety of others.

== Hours of operation, facilities ==
The park is open seven days a week:

- Sunday – Saturday 7:00 a.m. – 8:00 p.m

Public restrooms, and camping area with showers are provided.
