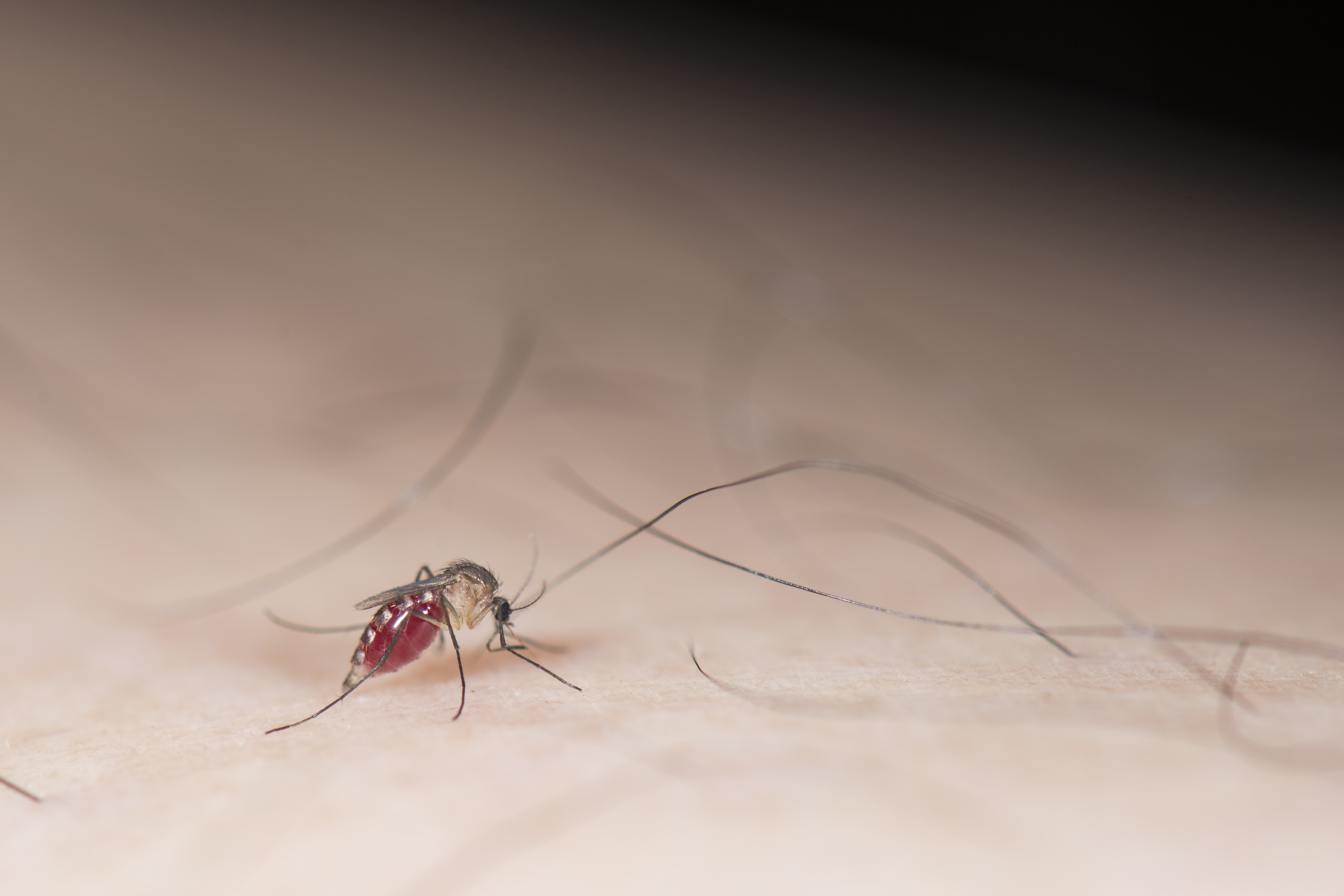
- Adult female

Scientific classification
- Kingdom: Animalia
- Phylum: Arthropoda
- Clade: Pancrustacea
- Class: Insecta
- Order: Diptera
- Family: Culicidae
- Genus: Culex
- Species: C. sitiens

Binomial name
- Culex sitiens Wiedemann, 1828

= Culex sitiens =

Species of mosquito

Culex sitiens is a species of mosquito in the genus Culex native to parts of Africa, Asia, and Oceania.

== Distribution ==
Culex sitiens is native to coastal areas of East Africa, including Madagascar, southwestern Asia, the Ryukyu Archipelago, Korea, northern Australia, and South Pacific islands.

== Pest status ==
There is evidence Cx. sitiens is a vector for Japanese encephalitis, as well as the roundworm Brugia malayi in Thailand.
