= PowerBuoy =

Marine power station

PowerBuoy is a series of low-carbon emission marine power stations manufactured by Ocean Power Technologies (OPT), a renewable energy company located in New Jersey. PowerBuoys are most commonly used to provide power to offshore payloads generated through eco-friendly means. The PowerBuoy is designed to act as an Uninterruptible power supply. It stores energy in onboard batteries so that it can still provide continuous power through low generation periods.

There are currently two models of the Powerbuoy being used commercially, with more being developed by OPT. The first is the original and more common PB3 PowerBuoy and the second is the Hybrid PowerBuoy, which primarily uses solar energy rather than wave energy. Both models of the PowerBuoy are designed to work with current and future devices, systems, and machines created by OPT.

== Models ==
=== PB3 PowerBuoy ===
The PB3 PowerBuoy is the original model of PowerBuoy developed by Ocean Power Technologies. The PB3 PowerBuoy functions as a point absorber, a device that harnesses wave energy to generate large amounts of power. PB3 PowerBuoys are designed to minimize operational costs by being easily deployable and using self-monitoring technology to allow quick and cheap maintenance.

==== Design ====
Specifications for PB3 PowerBuoy
| Height | Draft | Spar Diameter | Float Diameter | Weight | Mooring Min Depth | Mooring Max Depth |
|---|---|---|---|---|---|---|
| 13.3 m | 9.28 m | 1.0 m | 2.65 m | 8,300 kg | 25 m | 1,000 m |

The PB3 PowerBuoy has 3 main parts; the float, the spar, and the mooring. The float is the part of the buoy that rests on the surface of the water. It is usually a bright color like yellow, red, or orange. The spar is the large cylindrical section of the buoy located under the surface of the water. At the bottom of the spar is a large heavy plate which stops the spar from moving with the waves. The float is able to move freely up and down the spar. The mooring is what anchors the buoy in place. The mooring connects to the spar through a series of cables and rests under the surface of the water. Each PB3 PowerBuoy can have 1 to 3 moorings that can be adjusted to rest at different depths depending on the conditions and needs of the specific PB3 PowerBuoy.

PB3 PowerBuoys are designed to have maintenance every 3 years.

On the float of each PB3 PowerBuoy is a control and management system, a set of devices that take and process information to send back to PB3 PowerBuoy control centers. This system is used to self-monitor and provide proactive information allowing for more efficient and less costly maintenance, allowing for increased availability and effectiveness. As of July 2020 the control and management system expanded to include the PowerBuoy surveillance system.

==== Power Generation ====
The PB3 PowerBuoy uses the relative motion between the float and the spar to generate electricity. As waves move the float up and down the spar, the spar remains stationary due to the heavy plate at the bottom. As the float moves up and down, a large push rod connected to the top of the float is driven down into the spar. The linear motion of the rod is transformed into power through the Power take-off (PTO). The PTO is the system inside the spar that contains the machines and devices that transform the linear motion into electricity. First, an actuator turns the linear motion into rotational motion. The rotational motion is used to power a generator which produces alternating current (AC) power. AC power will periodically switch directions, which makes it harder to manage in a battery. The AC power goes through a power management system and is transformed into direct current (DC) power, power that flows in one direction and the power most commonly used in batteries. The DC power is then stored inside of the Energy Storage System (ESS). A cable transfers electricity from the ESS to an Under Sea Substation which acts as a hub for a group of PB3 PowerBuoys. The Substation takes the energy from a group of PowerBuoy and sends it either to the shore or to a separate payload through a long cable. The PB3 PowerBuoy is designed to keep some of the energy stored in the ESS at all times so that during a calm period without waves the buoy can provide continuous power using the stored energy.

The table above gives the averages for power generation and storage capabilities. The data varies for different PowerBuoys, as the power generation relies on location and time of year.

=== Hybrid PowerBuoy ===
The hybrid PowerBuoy was released in June 2020 as an alternative for the PB3 PowerBuoy. The goal of the hybrid PowerBuoy is to fill in for the PB3 PowerBuoy in locations where it was unreliable, such as areas with extreme weather conditions, heavy seas, or low waves. The hybrid PowerBuoy differs from the PB3 PowerBuoy in the way that it generates power. Instead of using the motion of the waves, the hybrid PowerBuoy comes equipped with solar panels, using solar energy to provide power to payloads.

==== Design ====
Specifications for hybrid PowerBuoy
| Length | Width | Height | Weight |
|---|---|---|---|
| 6.0 m | 2.2 m | 2.2 m | 14,000 kg (full fuel tanks) |

The hybrid PowerBuoy uses solar panels located on the top of the hybrid PowerBuoy to charge lithium iron phosphate batteries. The hybrid PowerBuoy uses single-point mooring to lower costs and make deployment faster and more efficient. A Stirling engine charges a battery to provide backup power if the solar panels are unable to provide enough power for short periods of time. Additionally, there is an optional mast that can be added to the topside of the hybrid PowerBuoy to allow integration with the PowerBuoy surveillance system like the PB3 PowerBuoy.

==== Power Generation ====
The hybrid PowerBuoy provides its power from the lithium-iron phosphate batteries located on board. These batteries are primarily charged by the solar panels also located on the hybrid PowerBuoy. In situations where the solar panels are not able to provide enough power to charge the batteries, then the backup battery will switch in to provide less eco-friendly power to keep the hybrid PowerBuoy as an Uninterruptible power supply. The batteries are connected to a cable that transfers the power to the payload.

Power information for hybrid PowerBuoy
| Continuous Payload Power | Peak Payload Power | Payload Usable Energy without refueling | Topside Payload Electrical Interface | Subsea Payload Electrical Interface |
|---|---|---|---|---|
| 850 W | 1000 W | 1100 - 2000 kWh | 24 Vdc standard- up to 1000 Vdc custom | 300 Vdc to 1000 Vdc through a mooring cable |

== Related Devices and Systems ==
=== PowerBuoy Surveillance System ===
The PowerBuoy surveillance system launched in July 2020. The surveillance system can be integrated with both models of the PowerBuoy and acts as an expansion of the communications and data collection devices already present. The system includes

- Lighting rod
- Radar
- HD/IR camera
- AIS antenna
- Marine lights
- AIS and Wi-Fi transponder
- Wind Sensor
- Communications Module Enclosure

One surveillance system is able to monitor over 1,600 sq. mi of the ocean's surface, either continuously or periodically. The systems can also be linked together to give visibility and information over a large ocean area. The system can be customized to include more features for specific niches, such as water quality and tsunami activity.

=== Subsea Battery ===
The Subsea Battery launched in August 2020.

The subsea battery is an environmentally conscious and economically efficient battery designed to power subsea payloads and can be integrated with both the PB3 PowerBuoy and the Hybrid PowerBuoy. However, it can also be utilized on its own or configured to be compatible with other power sources.

The Subsea Battery uses lithium-iron phosphate batteries and is made of environmentally friendly (light) metals. The Subsea Battery is designed for a 10-year life however the conditions it is put in can cause some variation.

Power information and Dimensions of the Subsea Battery
| Total Capacity | Voltage | Peak Power Delivery | Dimensions (LengthxWidthxHeight) | Total Weight | Depth Rating |
|---|---|---|---|---|---|
| 132 kWh | 250 VDC to 350 VDC | 15 kW | 3 m x 2 m x 2.1 m | 6,700 kg | 500 m |

== Uses ==
While initially designed with the goal of providing renewable energy to people living on land, over time OPT has shifted the focus of PowerBuoy to finding more specific niches as an offshore power system. surveillance, and communication device.

=== Defense and Security ===
PowerBuoy's ability to constantly power itself, go long periods without maintenance, and surveillance/communication capabilities make it a strong asset for organizations focusing on defense and security. PowerBuoys are able to be placed in remote areas across the ocean and provide continuous information to on shore facilities. This makes them ideal for monitoring remote sections of ocean for illegal activities such as human and drug trafficking. Organizations utilizing PowerBuoys can get continuous updates on the boats that enter pockets of the ocean where PowerBuoys are monitoring.

=== Science and Research ===
PowerBuoys provide a cost-efficient and eco-friendly way for research to be done in remote areas of the ocean. PowerBuoys provide power to machines and devices used by scientists and researchers to understand climate change, ecosystems, weather patterns, and more. The low operational cost of PowerBuoys along with them not needing consistent maintenance makes it ideal for longer operations.

=== Communication ===
PowerBuoys expand communication networks using their built-in surveillance and communication systems. As they can be placed in remote offshore areas and power themselves, Powerbuoys are able to be used as a stable communication platform that can expand already existing networks. This allows users and organizations to expand their range for both commercial and recreational uses.
