= Kāneʻohe Bay =

Large bay of volcanic origin in the Hawaiian island O'ahu

- Kaneohe Bay
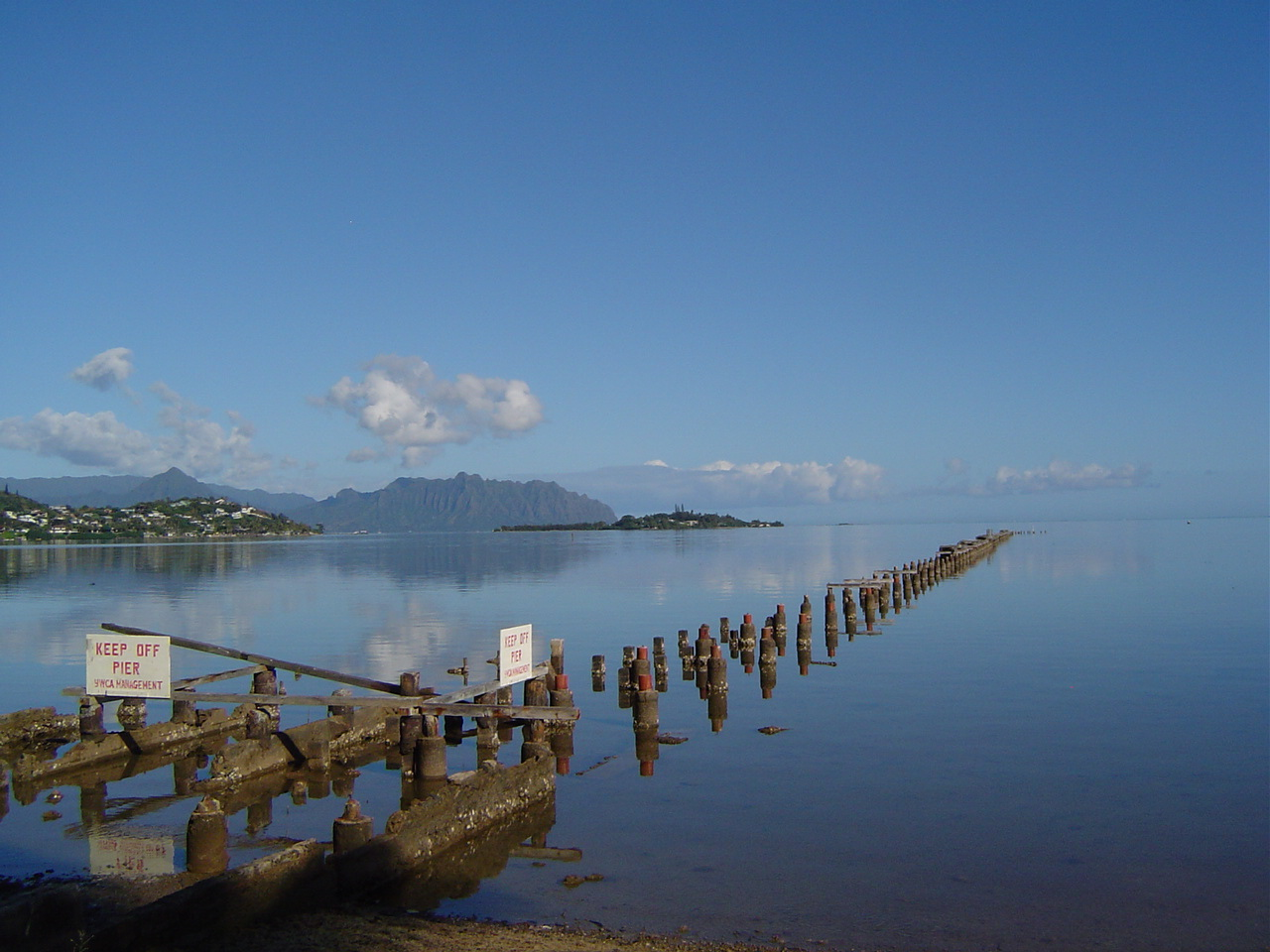
- Kāneʻohe Bay on a calm morning viewed from the Kokokahi YWCA at the south end of the bay. Coconut Island appears in the middle of this picture.

- Location within Oahu Location within Hawaii Location within Pacific Ocean
- Location: Hawaii
- Coordinates: 21°27′46″N 157°48′37″W
- Type: Bay
- Max. length: 8 mi (13 km)
- Max. width: 2.7 mi (4.3 km)
- Surface area: 45 km^{2} (17 sq mi)
- Max. depth: 40 ft (12 m)
- Islands: 5

Kāneʻohe Bay, at 45 km^{2} (17 sq mi), is the largest sheltered body of water in the main Hawaiian Islands. This reef-dominated embayment constitutes a significant scenic and recreational feature along the northeast coast of the Island of Oʻahu. The largest population center on Kāneʻohe Bay is the town of Kāneʻohe.

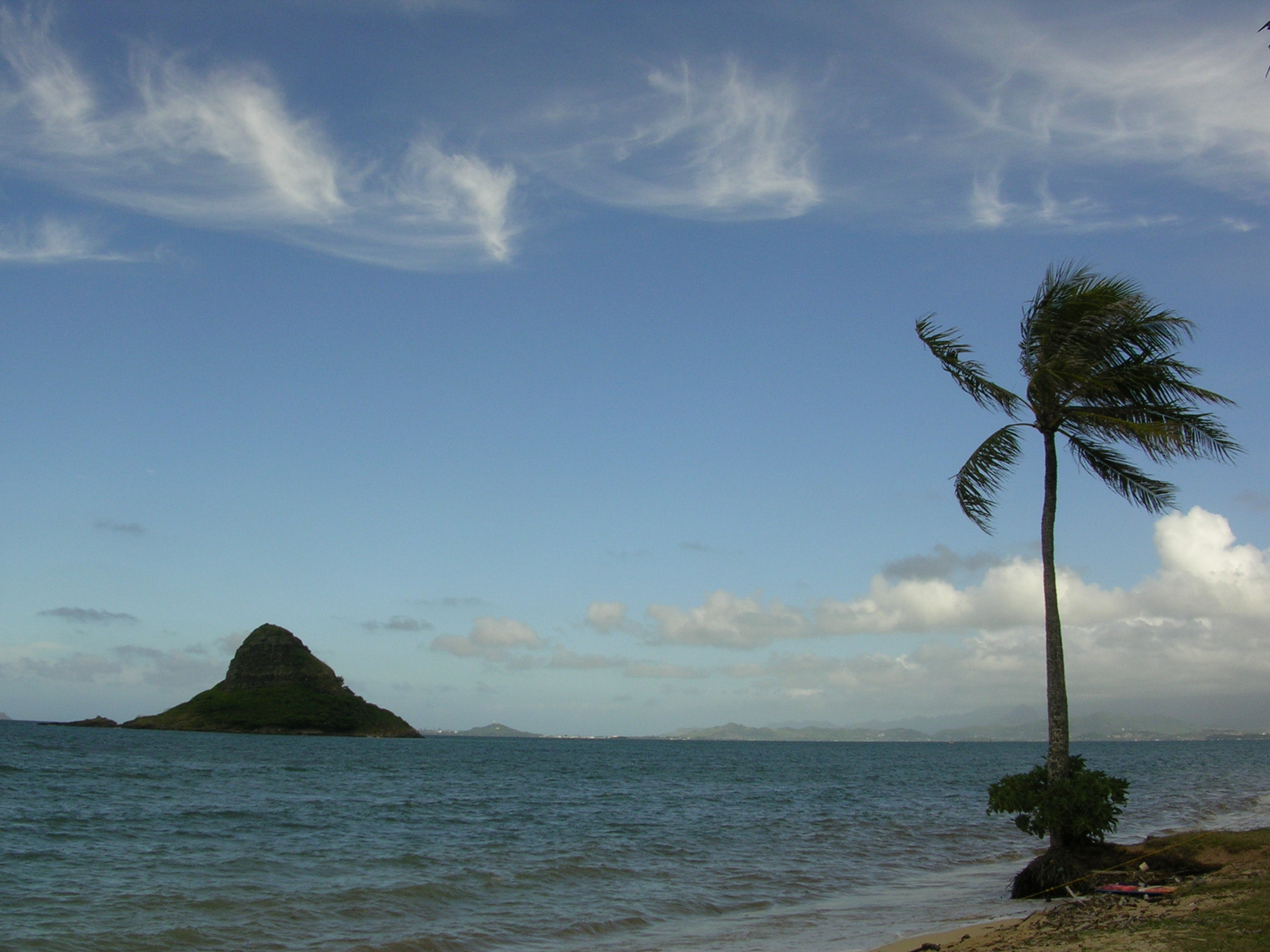
Mokoliʻi, a prominent island at the northern edge of Kāneʻohe Bay

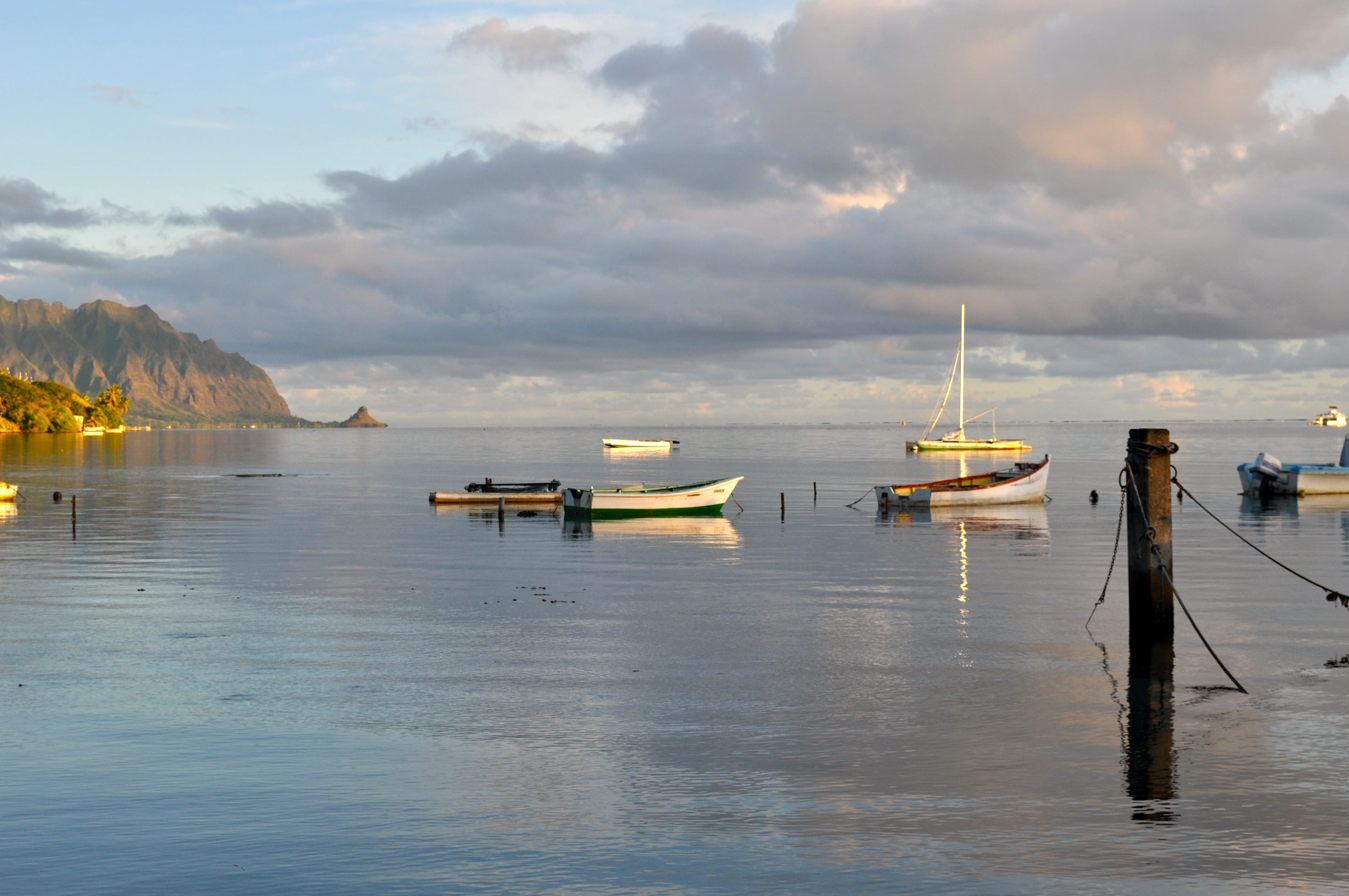
The bay seen on a clear morning from Heeia Kea Small Boat Harbor Marina pier looking north towards Mokoliʻi

The Bay is approximately 8 mi (13 km) long and 2.7 mi (4.3 km) wide, with a mouth opening of about 4.6 mi (7.4 km) wide and a maximum depth of 40 ft (12 m) in the dredged channel. It has one of the two barrier reefs in the archipelago, the other being the 27 mi (43 km) barrier reef of Molokaʻi island, and also has extensive development of shoaling coral reefs within a large lagoon. Two navigable channels cut across the northern and southern ends of the barrier reef. The deeper, northern channel, located off Kualoa Regional Park, provides entrance from the North Pacific Ocean to a ship channel dredged the length of the lagoon between 1939 and 1945. The lagoon contains extensive patch and fringing reefs and its southern end is partly enclosed by the Mokapu Peninsula. This peninsula is occupied by Marine Corps Base Hawaii.

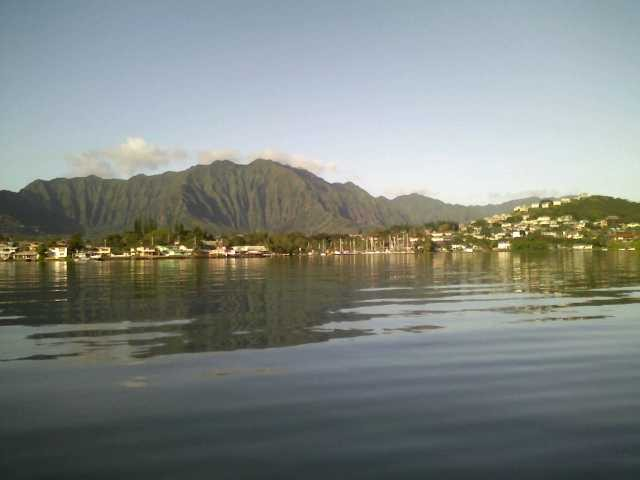
Koʻolau Mountain Range seen on a clear morning from Kaneʻohe Bay on a boat

There are five named islands or islets within Kāneʻohe Bay. A sand bar (Ahu o Laka), Kapapa, and Kekepa (Turtleback Rock) are all islets on the barrier reef. Two islands within Kāneʻohe Bay are prominent: Mokoliʻi and Moku o Loʻe (Coconut Island), the largest of the five. Mokoliʻi is a volcanic remnant at the very north end of the Bay, site of former Kualoa Airfield. The community on the northern side is called Waikane, or North Koʻolaupoko.

Coconut Island is an isolated volcanic remnant located in the southwest part of the bay. Coconut Island is owned by the state of Hawaiʻi and home to the University of Hawaiʻi, and Pauley-Pagen Laboratory (SOEST). Coconut Island was used for the opening sequence of the television program Gilligan's Island.

In August 2010, Pirates of the Caribbean: On Stranger Tides was filmed on the bay.

Geologically, Kāneʻohe Bay forms part of a former caldera of the Koʻolau volcano. In prehistory, most of the volcano cataclysmically slid into the Pacific Ocean, leaving behind only the Range and the Bay.

== See also ==
- Kamehameha Highway
