= Oceanian cuisine =

Cuisine native to the South Pacific

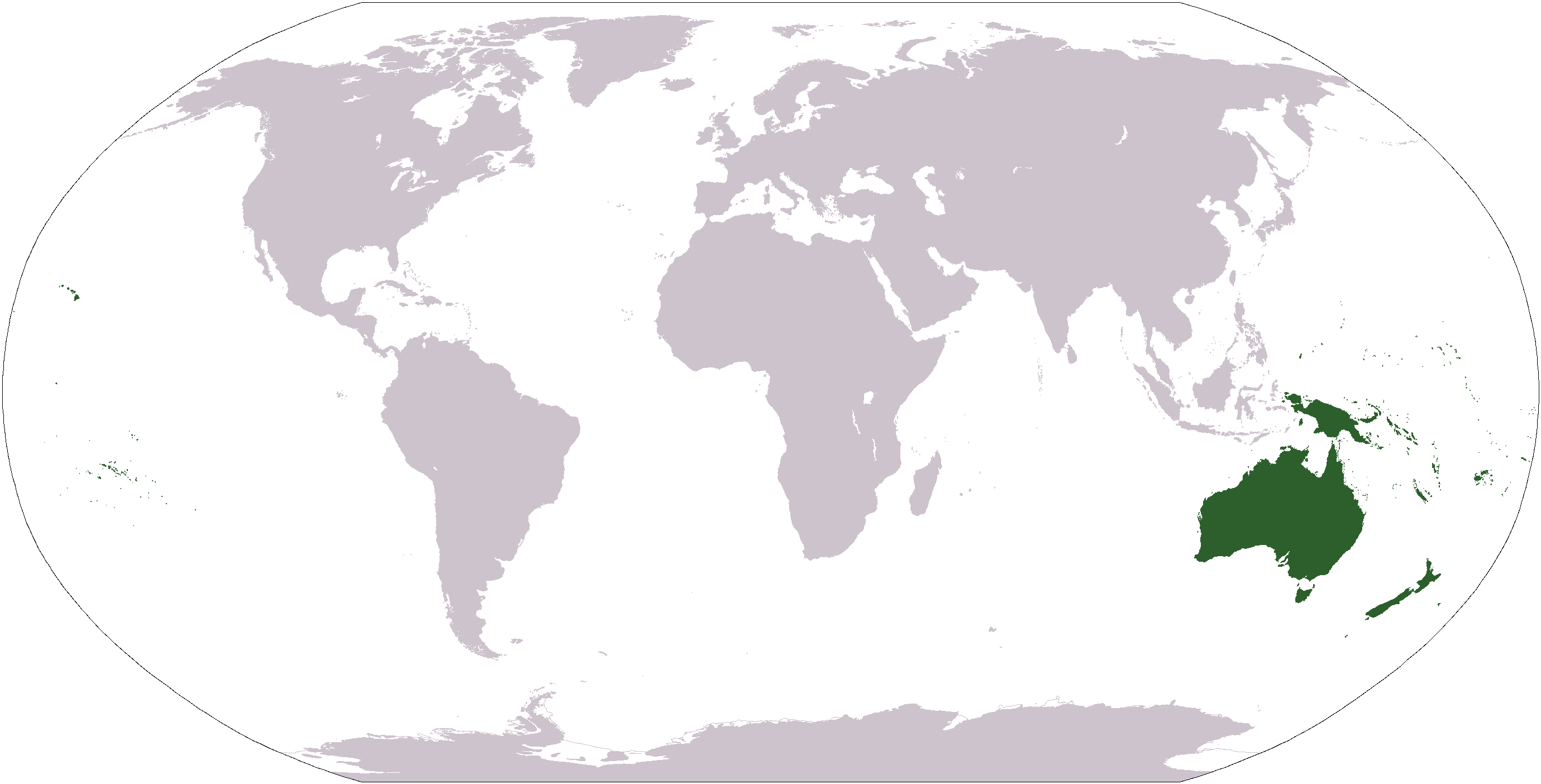

The cuisines of Oceania include those found on Australia, New Zealand, and New Guinea, and also cuisines from many other islands or island groups throughout Oceania.

Since the region of Oceania consists of islands, seafood is a prominent part of the diet, with vegetables such as potatoes, sweet potato, taro and yams being the main starch. Coconut, and its derivative products such as coconut milk, coconut oil and coconut sugar, are important ingredients in the tropics of Oceania.

One of the most distinctive styles of cooking throughout Oceania is the earth oven, a method which involves laying food on hot rocks and burying it in earth. The technique originated in Papua New Guinea and was subsequently spread by Austronesian seafarers. It was historically the main method of cooking among the Polynesians ideal to their tree and root crops thus made the established pottery culture of their Lapita ancestors obsolete; lack of pottery also made stone boiling, that is boiling water by dropping fire-heated stones, a main cooking method. Some Polynesian peoples in their contact with European explorers centuries later quickly adopted to the latter's metal cookware, as was what happened between the Māori of Poverty Bay confronting James Cook's HMS Endeavour in 1769.

== Australia ==
Other than by climate and produce availability, Australian cuisine has been influenced by the tastes of settlers to Australia. The British colonial period established a strong base of interest in Anglo-Celtic style recipes and methods. Later influences developed out of multicultural immigration and included Chinese, Japanese, Malaysian, Thai, and Vietnamese cuisines. Mediterranean cuisine influences from Greek cuisine, Italian cuisine, and Lebanese cuisine influences are strong, also influences from French cuisine, Indian cuisine, Spanish cuisine, and Turkish cuisine, German cuisine, and African cuisine. Regional Australian cuisines commonly use locally grown vegetables based on seasonal availability, and Australia also has large fruit-growing regions. The Granny Smith variety of apples originated in Sydney, Australia in 1868. In the Southern states of Victoria and South Australia, in particular the Barossa Valley, wines and food reflect the region's traditions and heritage. Australia's climate makes barbecues commonplace. Barbecue stalls selling sausages and fried onion on white bread with tomato or barbecue sauce are common.

- (Australia) Australian cuisine
  - New South Wales cuisine
  - Northern Territory cuisine
  - Queensland cuisine
  - (South Australia) South Australian cuisine
  - (Tasmania) Tasmanian cuisine
  - (Victoria (state)) Victorian cuisine
  - (Western Australia) Western Australian cuisine
- Christmas Island cuisine
- (Cocos (Keeling) Islands) Cocossian cuisine
- Norfolk Island cuisine
Australian foods and dishes

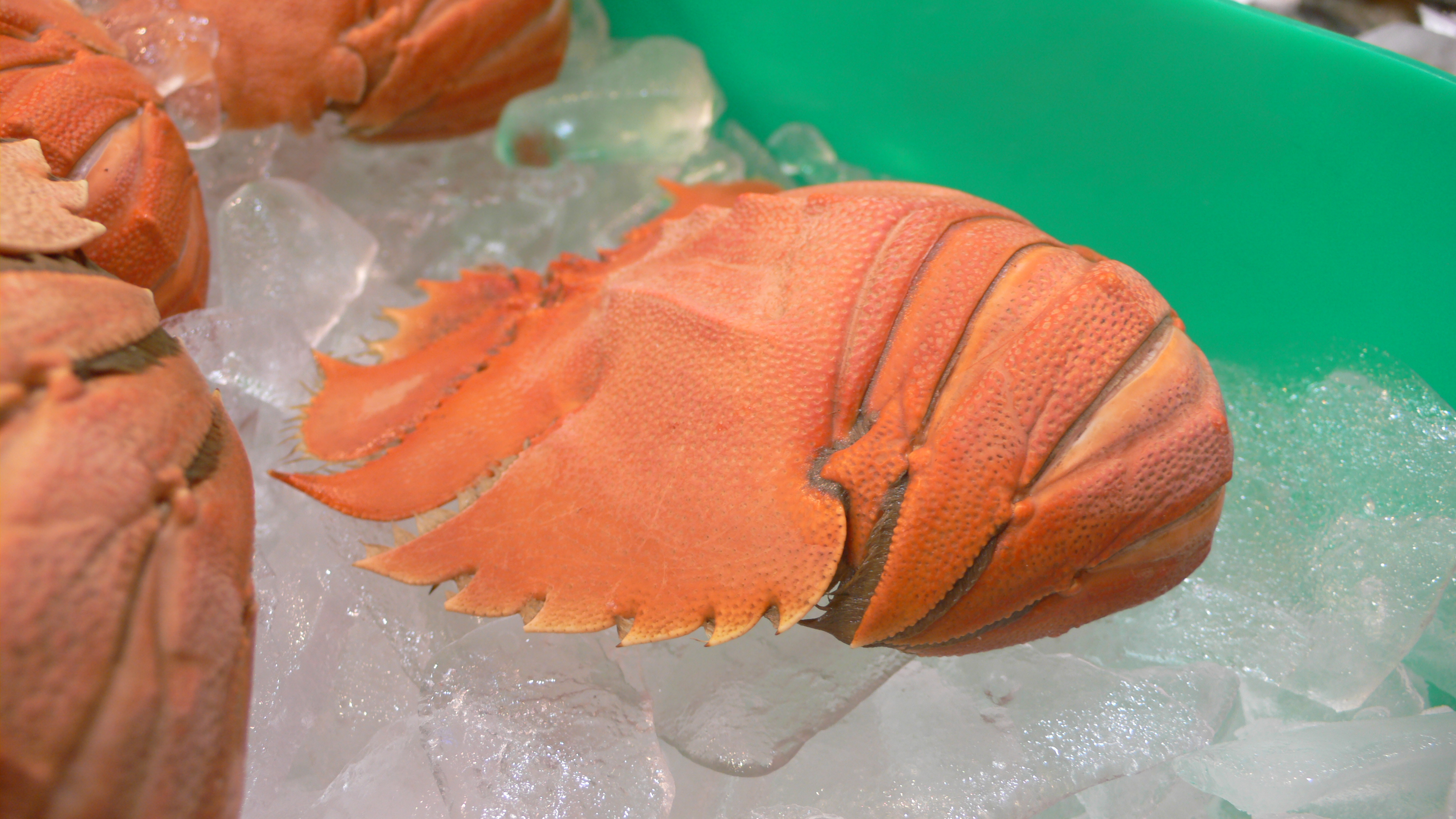
A cooked Balmain bug. Also known as the butterfly fan lobster, it is a species of slipper lobster that lives in shallow waters around Australia.

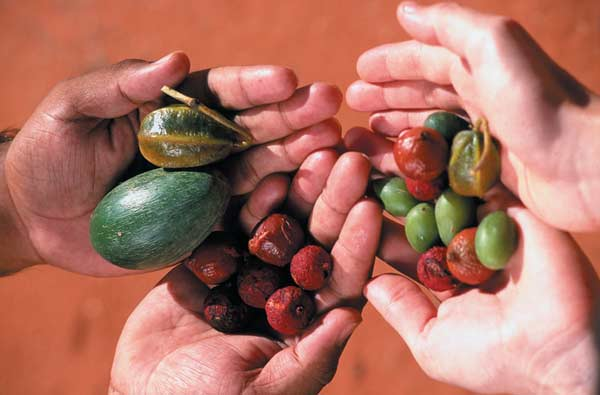
Bush tucker (bush foods) harvested at Alice Springs Desert Park. Bush foods are edible native plant species and animal products used by indigenous Australians as a contemporary or traditional food.

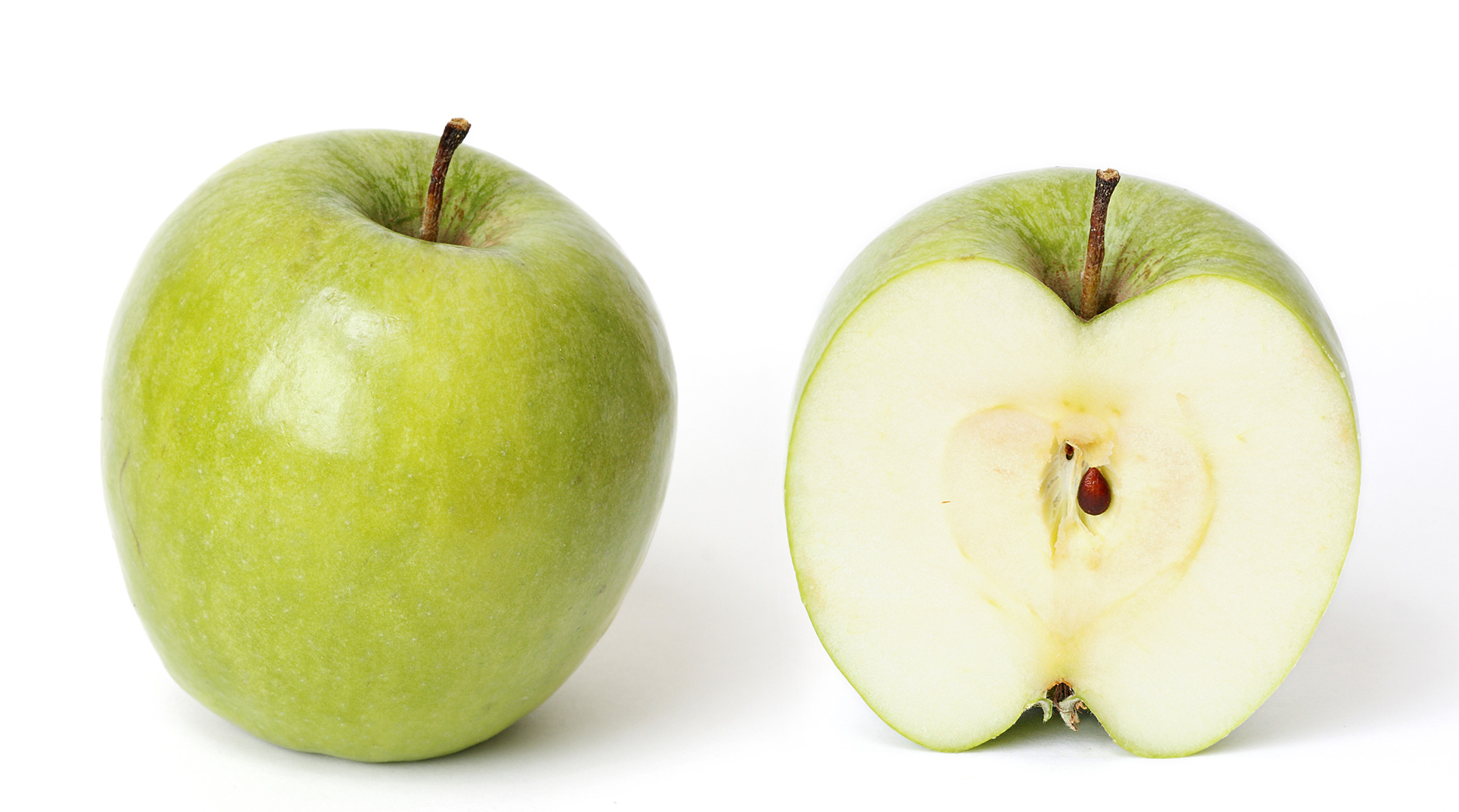
Granny Smith apples originated in Australia.

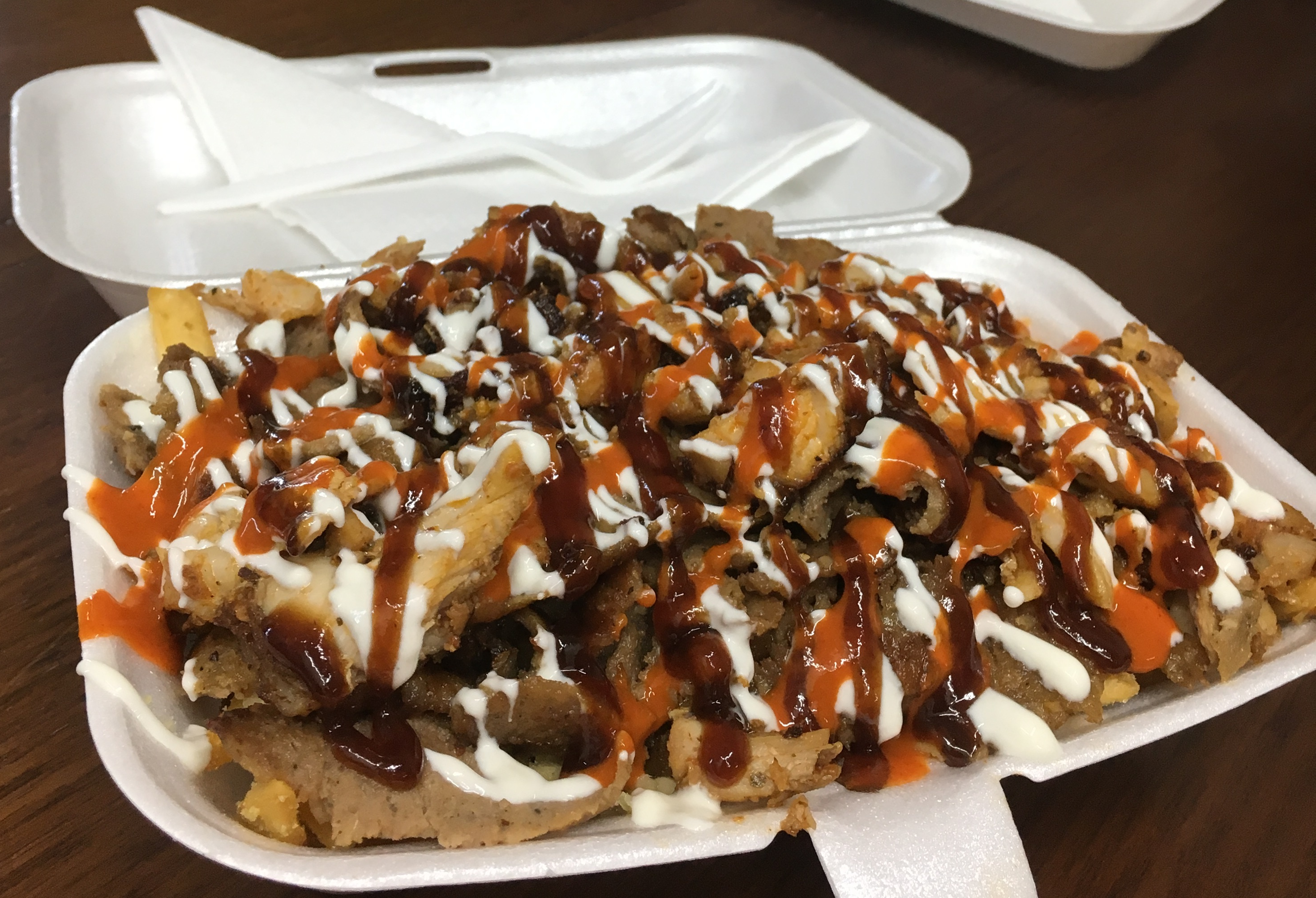
Halal snack pack, an Australian fast food dish of doner kebab meat and chips with sauces.

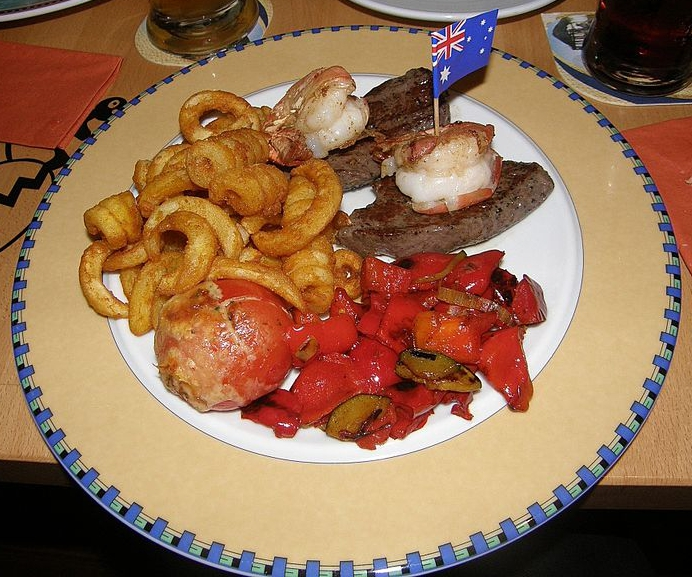
A dish from an Australian restaurant.

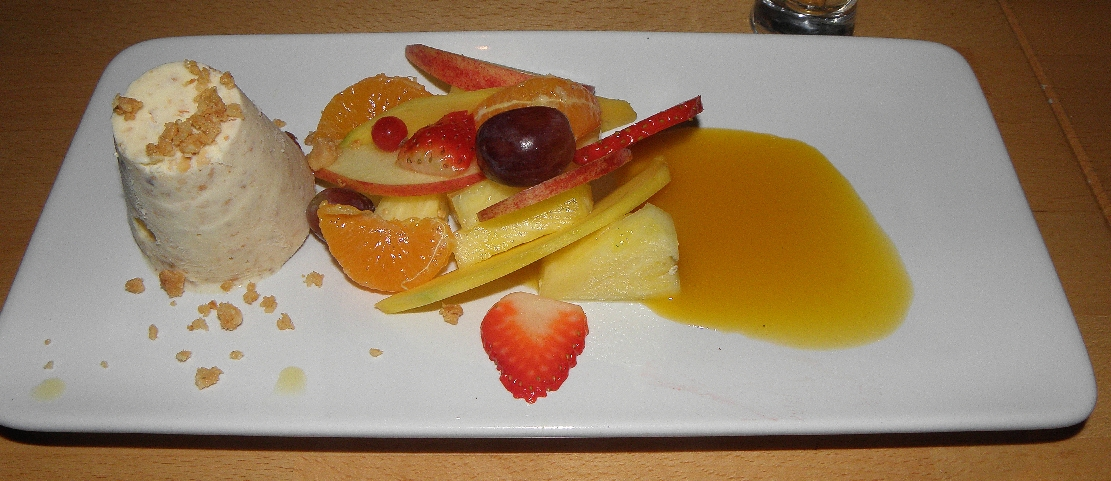
A fruit dessert dish in an Australian restaurant.

== Melanesia ==
- (Fiji) Fijian cuisine
- (New Caledonia) New Caledonian cuisine
- (Papua New Guinea) Papua New Guinean cuisine
- Solomon Islands cuisine
- (Vanuatu) Vanuatuan cuisine
Melanesian foods and dishes

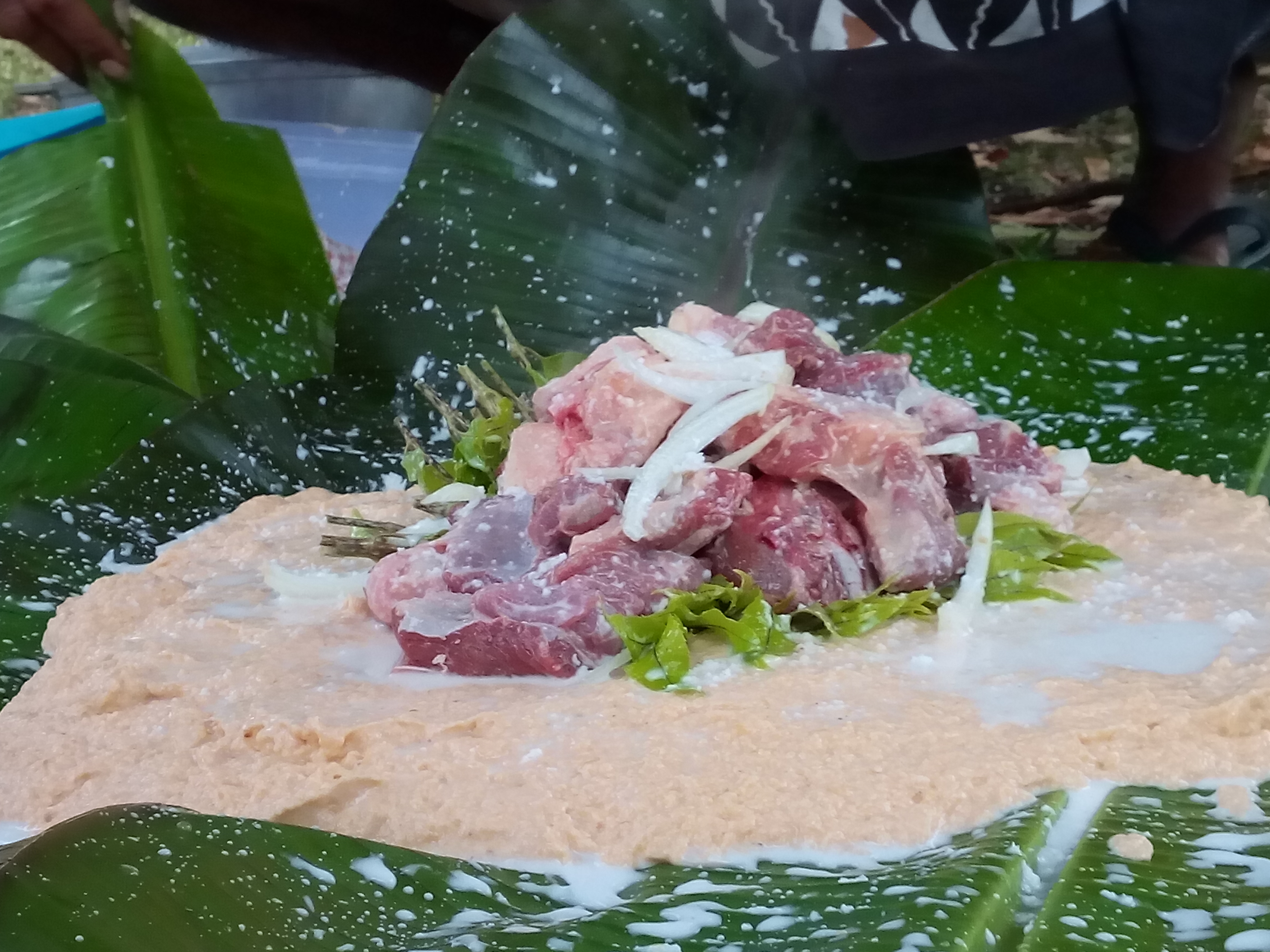
Laplap, the national dish of Vanuatu.

== Micronesia ==
- (Kiribati) Gilbertese cuisine
- Guam (Chamorro) cuisine
- (Marshall Islands) Marshallese cuisine
- (Federated States of Micronesia) Micronesian cuisine
- (Nauru) Nauruan cuisine
- (Northern Mariana Islands) Northern Marianan cuisine
- (Palau) Palauan cuisine
Micronesian foods and dishes

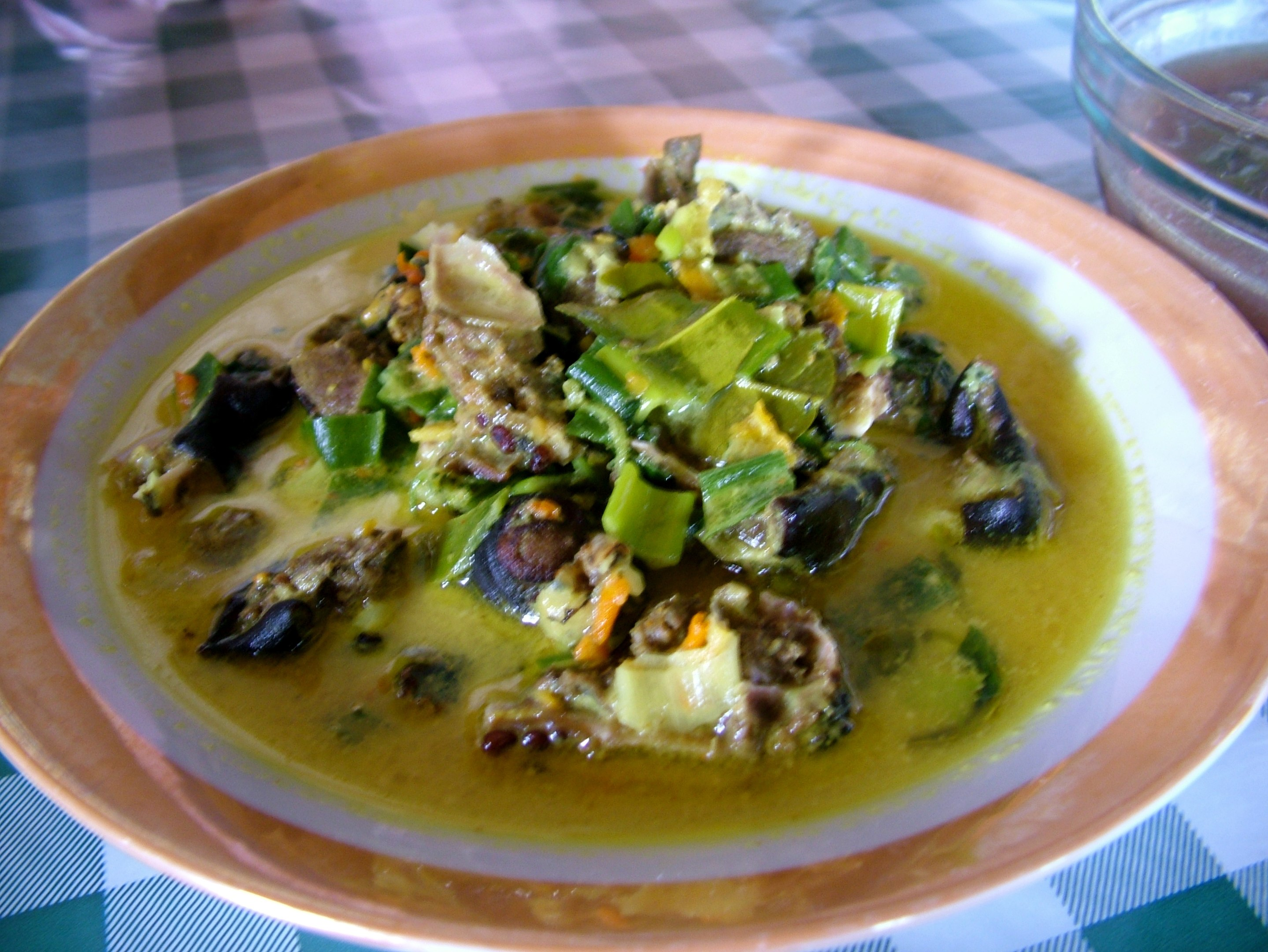
Paniki in yellow soup

== Polynesia ==
Polynesian cuisine encompasses the culinary practices of Polynesia, an area notably defined as the Polynesian Triangle and, occasionally, the Polynesian outliers that have been settled by Polynesian seafarers. The vast area of Polynesia has had a great influence on the cuisine itself, which differs as a result of climate, geography and neighbouring island groups, such as the practice of harvesting and boiling down coconut sap in the atolls from Micronesian peoples or the harvesting and processing of sago in the outliers from Melanesians. Polynesian cuisine has been influenced by the traditional ingredients and preparations of the Polynesians, as well as European, Asian and American culinary practices. Polynesian cuisine has influenced Malagasy cuisine.

- (American Samoa) American Samoan cuisine
- Cook Islands cuisine
- (French Polynesia) French Polynesian cuisine
- (Hawaii) Hawaiian cuisine
  - (Kanaka Maoli) Native Hawaiian cuisine
- New Zealand cuisine
  - (Māori people) Māori cuisine
- (Niue) Niuean cuisine
- (Easter Island) Pascuense cuisine
- Pitcairn Islands cuisine
- (Samoa) Samoan cuisine
- (Tokelau) Tokelauan cuisine
- (Tonga) Tongan cuisine
- (Tuvalu) Tuvaluan cuisine
- Wallis and Futuna cuisine

Some cuisines divide their meal into food classes:

- a main plant-based staple such as breadfruit or poi (in Hawaiian: ʻai or ʻai nui, Tahitian: māʻa, Tongan: kiki)
- animal-based side dishes including meat, eggs, fish and shellfish (as ʻīnaʻi in many related languages)
Polynesian foods and dishes

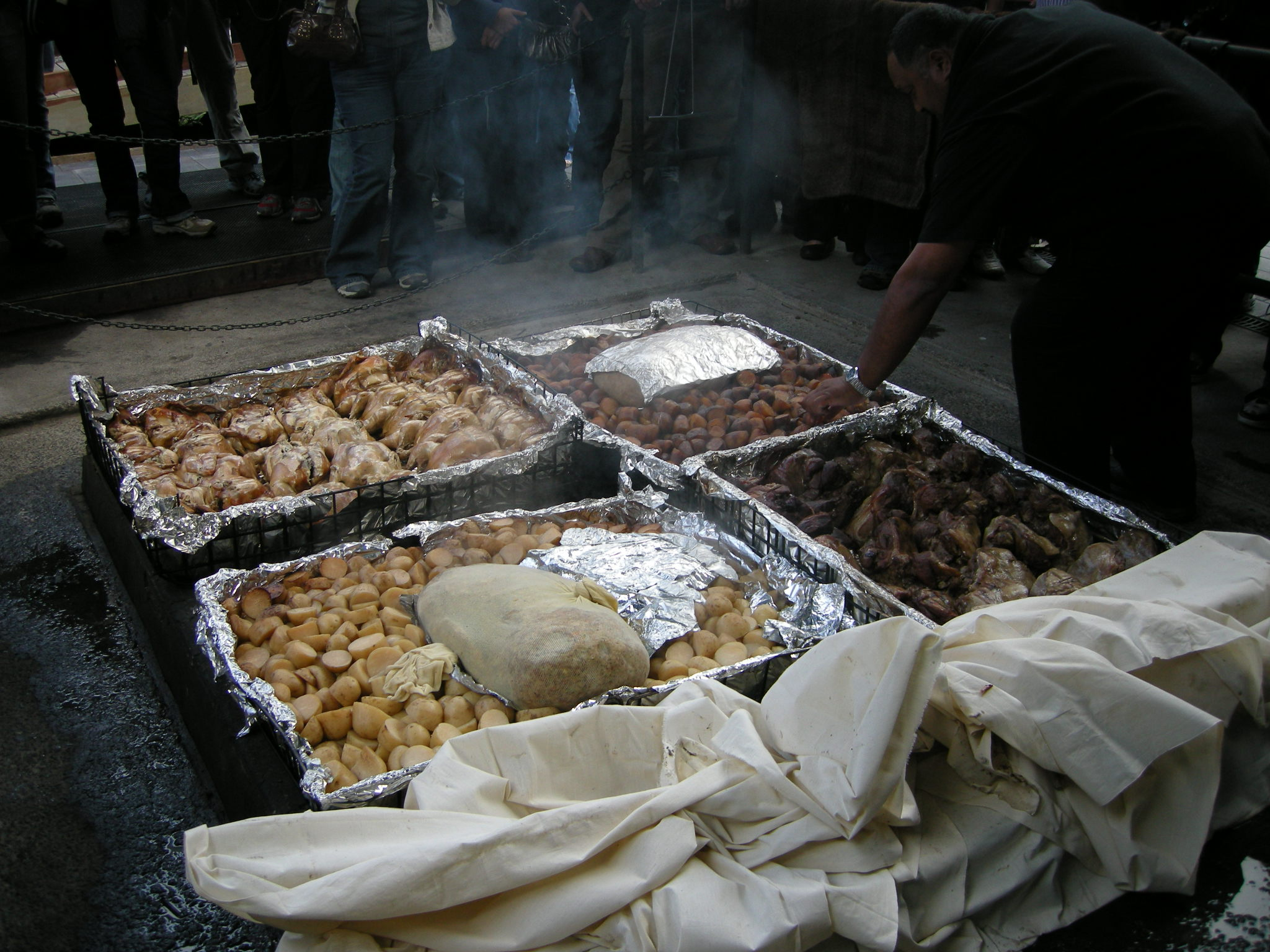
A hāngī being prepared, a New Zealand Māori method of cooking food for special occasions using hot rocks buried in a pit oven.

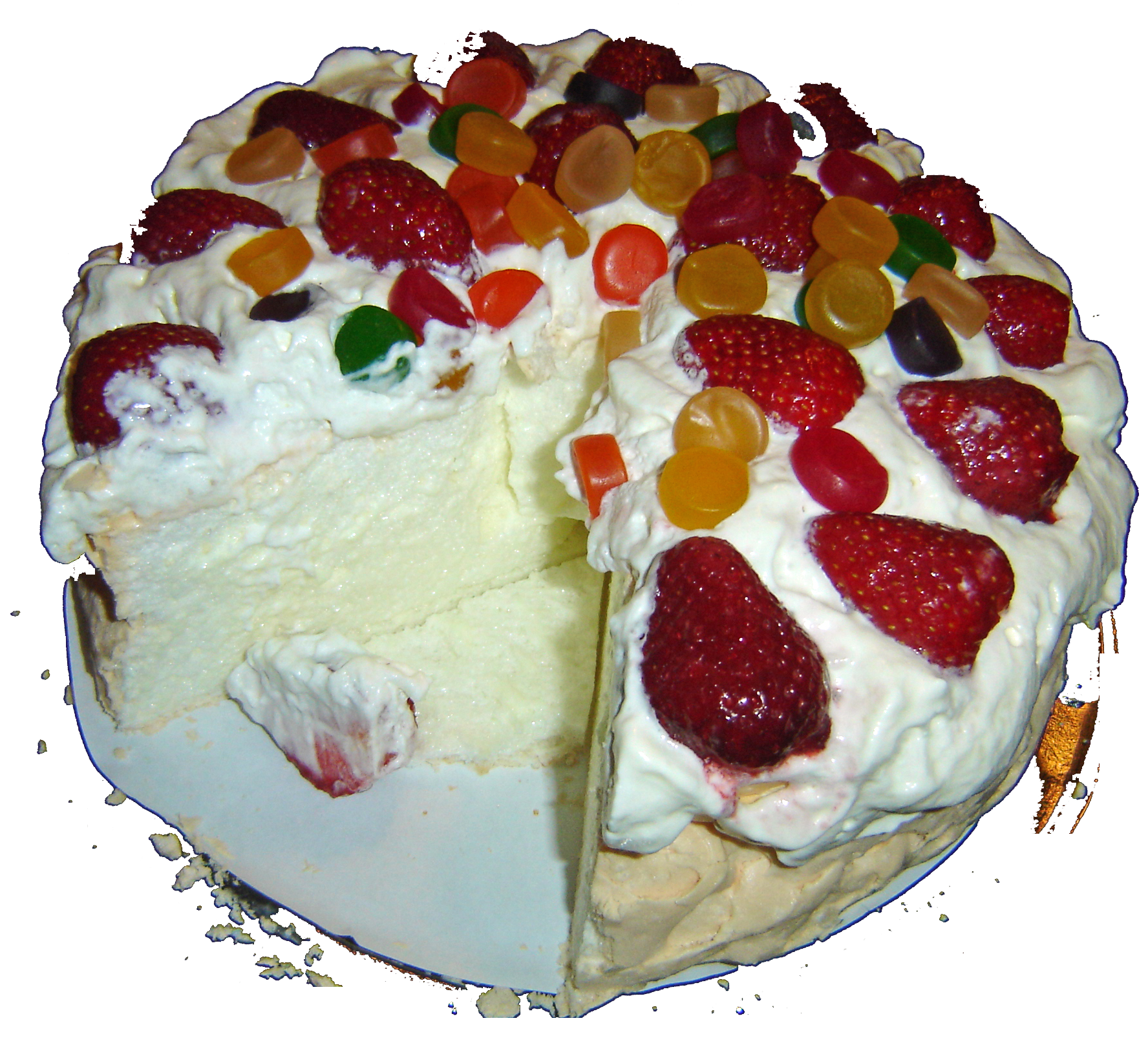
A pavlova is a meringue-based dessert and an icon of Australian and New Zealand cuisine.

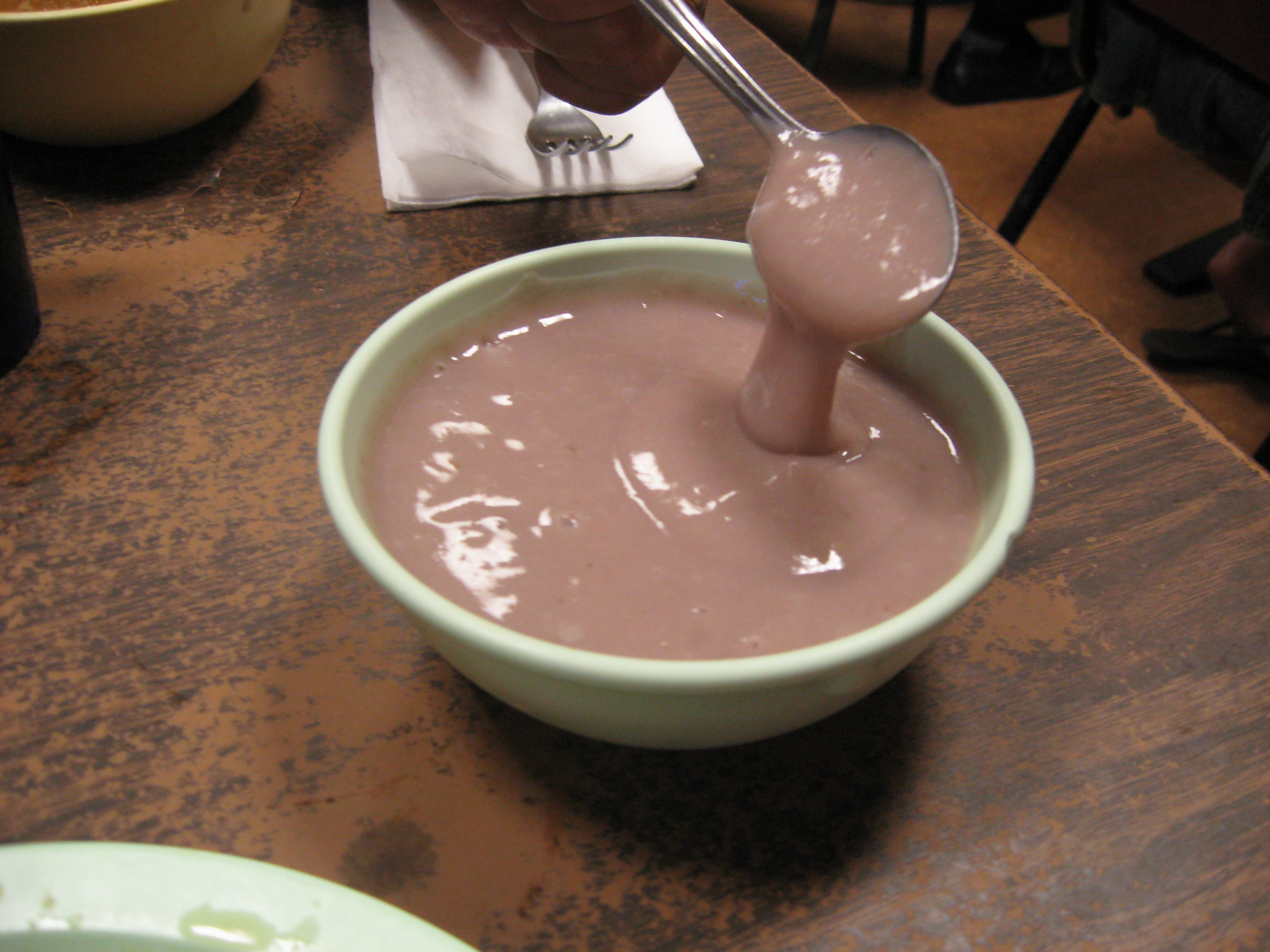
A bowl of poi, a starchy paste eaten in Eastern Polynesia.

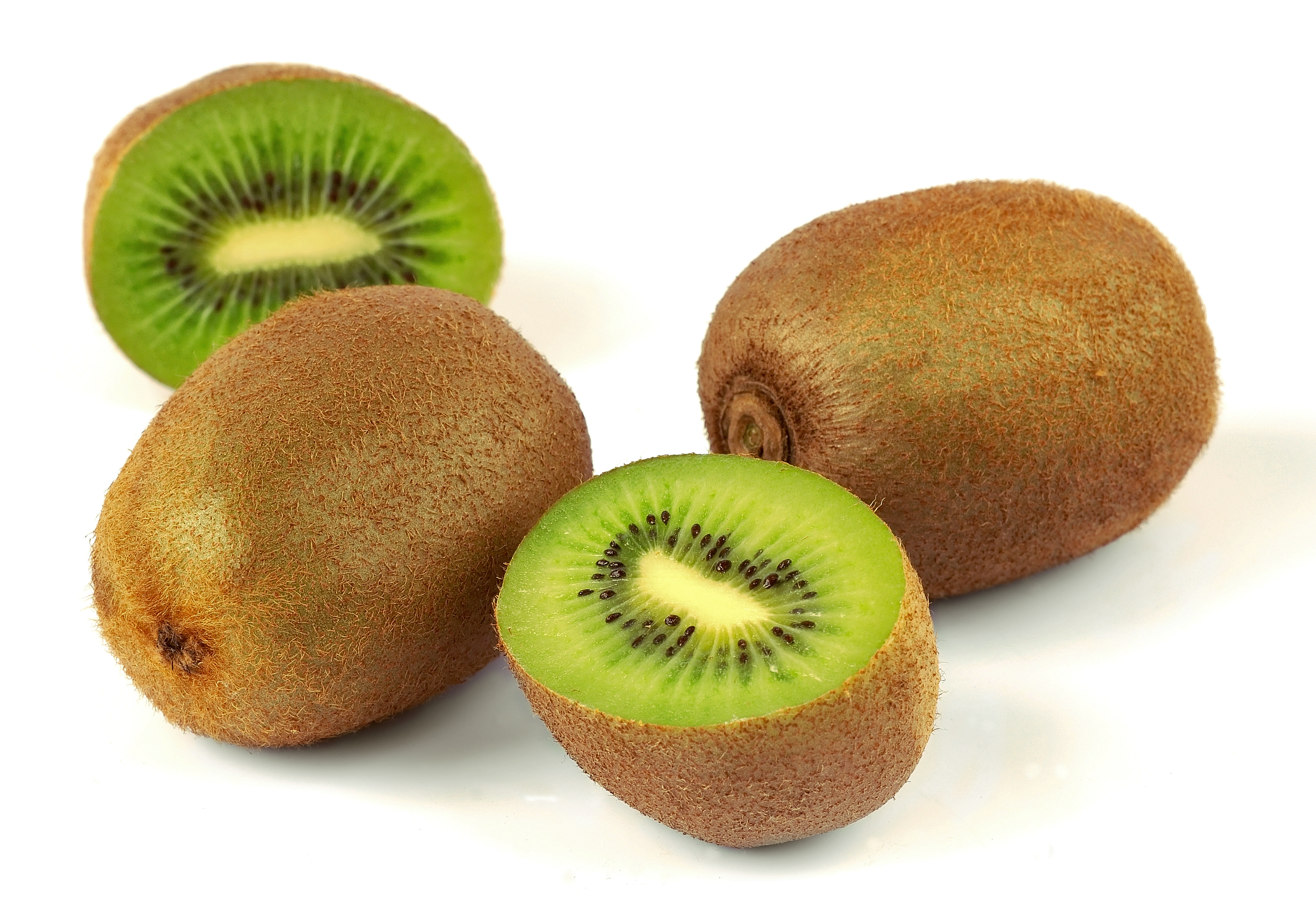
Kiwifruit, a well-known New Zealand food.

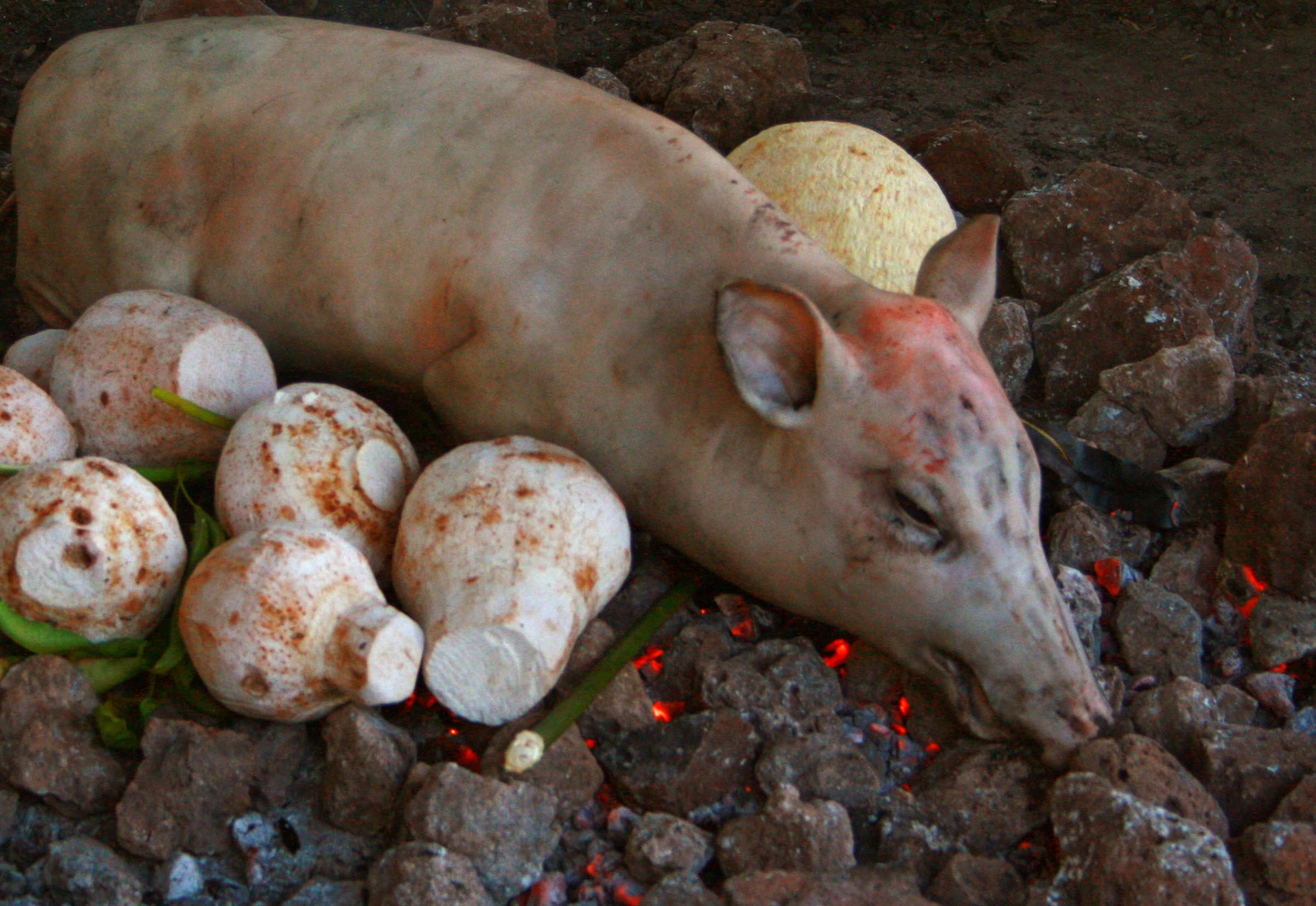
Samoan umu, an oven of hot rocks above ground.

== See also ==
- List of cuisines
- Culture of Oceania
