= Fijian cuisine =

Culinary tradition

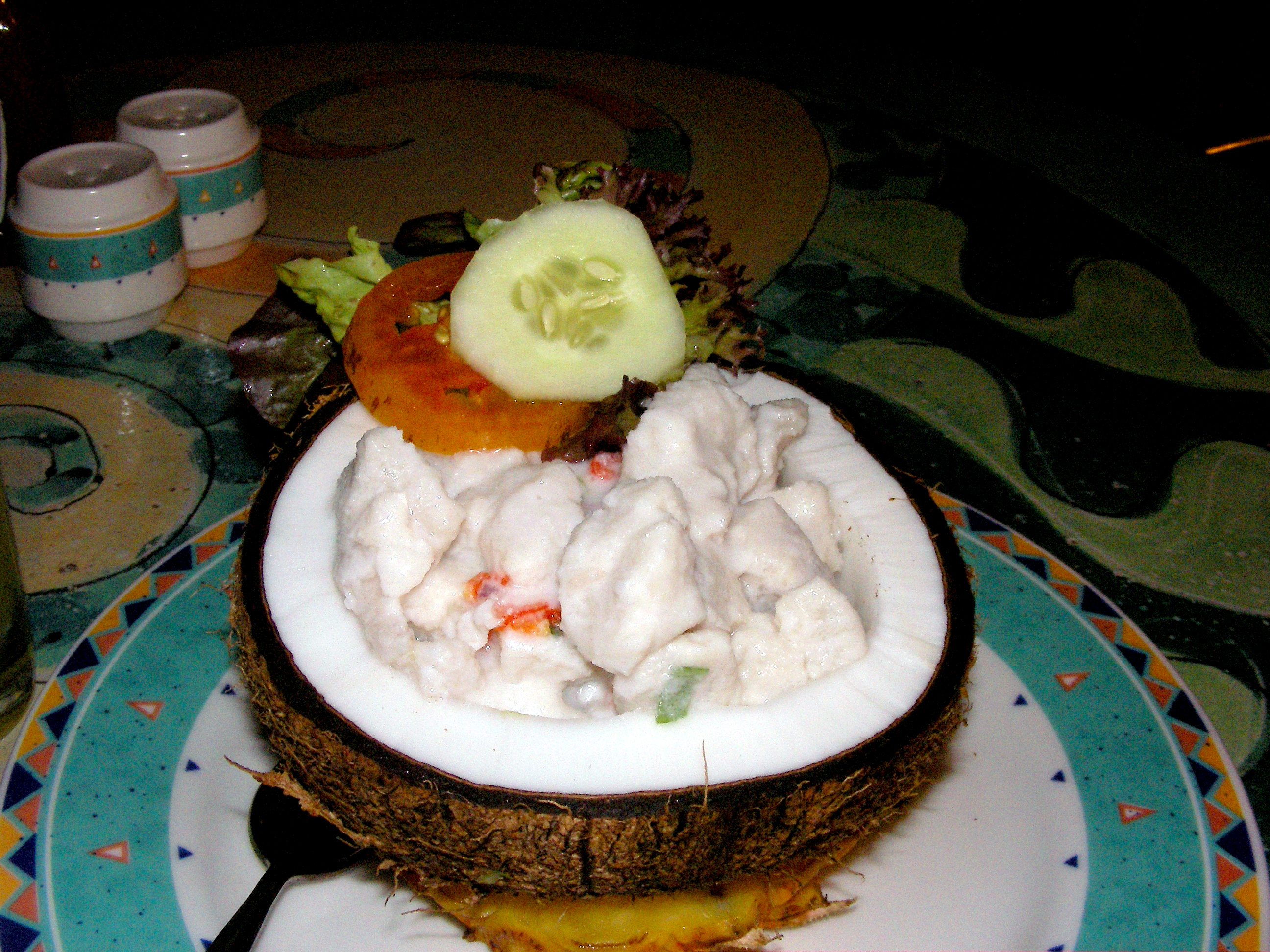
- Kokoda, raw fish served in a coconut
- Country or region: Fiji
- National dishes: Curry, lovo
- National drink: Kava

Fijian cuisine has long consisted of primarily foraged and farm-grown food. Although rice, wheat, and tea all became staples during Fiji's colonial era, native Fijians still eat primarily tubers and coconuts. The cuisine of Fiji is known for its seafood and green vegetables, including ota, a young forest fern, and bele ("slippery cabbage"), a plant that resembles spinach.

Fiji's recent past as a colony of the British Empire has had significant impact on its cuisine, as the British indentured servitude system brought many Indians to the islands and substantially shaped the cuisine into what it is today.

In many homes, breakfast includes regional dishes like roti and curry, boiled taro and fish soup, and cabin crackers with butter in addition to goods like bread, cereal, milk, tea, and coffee. The diet is comparable to that of neighbouring island countries like Samoa and Tonga. A wide range of food is available thanks to the old trade routes that span these nations.

Meats like chicken and lamb are common, whereas cattle and pork are reared for special occasions like weddings and purchased young. Lamb and chicken sausages, as well as eggs, are frequently the least expensive sources of protein in homes. Many people get their protein mostly from seafood, and many children enjoy going fishing for an entire meal. Due to numerous indigenous peoples living along the coast, freshwater and marine prawns, mussels, clams, sea urchins, sea cucumbers, oysters, lobsters, fish, crabs, octopus, and squid have been the main source of nourishment for many years.

For many years, turtle was also eaten; however, due to changing habits and dwindling populations, the Fijian government has heavily restricted or forbidden the consumption of many endangered species. Sharks are never consumed as they are believed to represent the sea god Dakuwaqa and are therefore taboo. To kill or eat a shark is believed to bring great misfortune on the village.

Coconut milk, sea water, Indian spices, onions, carrots, garlic, ginger, limes, lemons, curry leaves and chili are also the primary flavorings, with Chinese influences from soy and oyster sauce being popular additions.

Lunch in the villages consists of a steamed starchy item such as cassava or taro, a soup and tea, sweetened with cane sugar. Indo-Fijian families may stick to traditional rice, dhal and either a meat or vegetable curry accompanied by a salad or chutney. Masala tea is the main drink in many Indo-Fijian households. Many city people, however, are turning to easily available Western fast food, which is now becoming a popular choice for younger generations.

Dinner is usually elaborate and meat-based, such as stews, soups, curries, stir-fries and traditional earth oven food called lovo (similar to an umu or hangi). This is usually served with a simple salad and rice or root vegetable to bulk up the meals. Fijian diets are also based on foraged items such as forest ferns and wild herbs which are now readily sold in food markets. Herbs such as coriander and mint are often used to flavour both sweet and savoury dishes. Tinned goods are pantry basics and frequently include tinned mackerel, sardines, tuna, baked beans, corned beef, corned mutton and condensed milk. Dessert dishes include a steamed coconut pudding, a dense cake similar to spotted dick but flavoured with cardamom, ginger, condensed milk, coconut milk and sugarcane syrup. This cake is a well loved classic with many families eating it either hot or cold, spread with butter. Another popular dessert is vakalolo made with grated cassava, ginger, sugar, cardamom and coconut milk. The mixture is shaped into small, flat pancakes, wrapped in banana leaves and steamed. A dense, chewy and sweet dish, vakalolo has incorporated many Indian spices to enhance the flavours.

A common feast is the lovo, where food is wrapped and cooked for several hours on hot stones covered with earth and sacks. Similar to the New Zealand hangi, the Fijian style of lovo uses soy sauce, garlic, chilli and ginger as flavourings for meat. Fish are usually steamed in taro leaves with onions, garlic, chilli and coconut milk called fish-in-lolo. Another common lovo item is palusami; consisting of young, tender taro leaves, coconut milk, ginger, garlic, chilli, lime juice, salt and possibly including corned beef, mutton or fish, palusami is also a common menu item along with rourou, a similar taro leaf dish. Yams, cassava and taro are the main starches in a lovo, and it takes many people to prepare, hence its significance.

== History ==
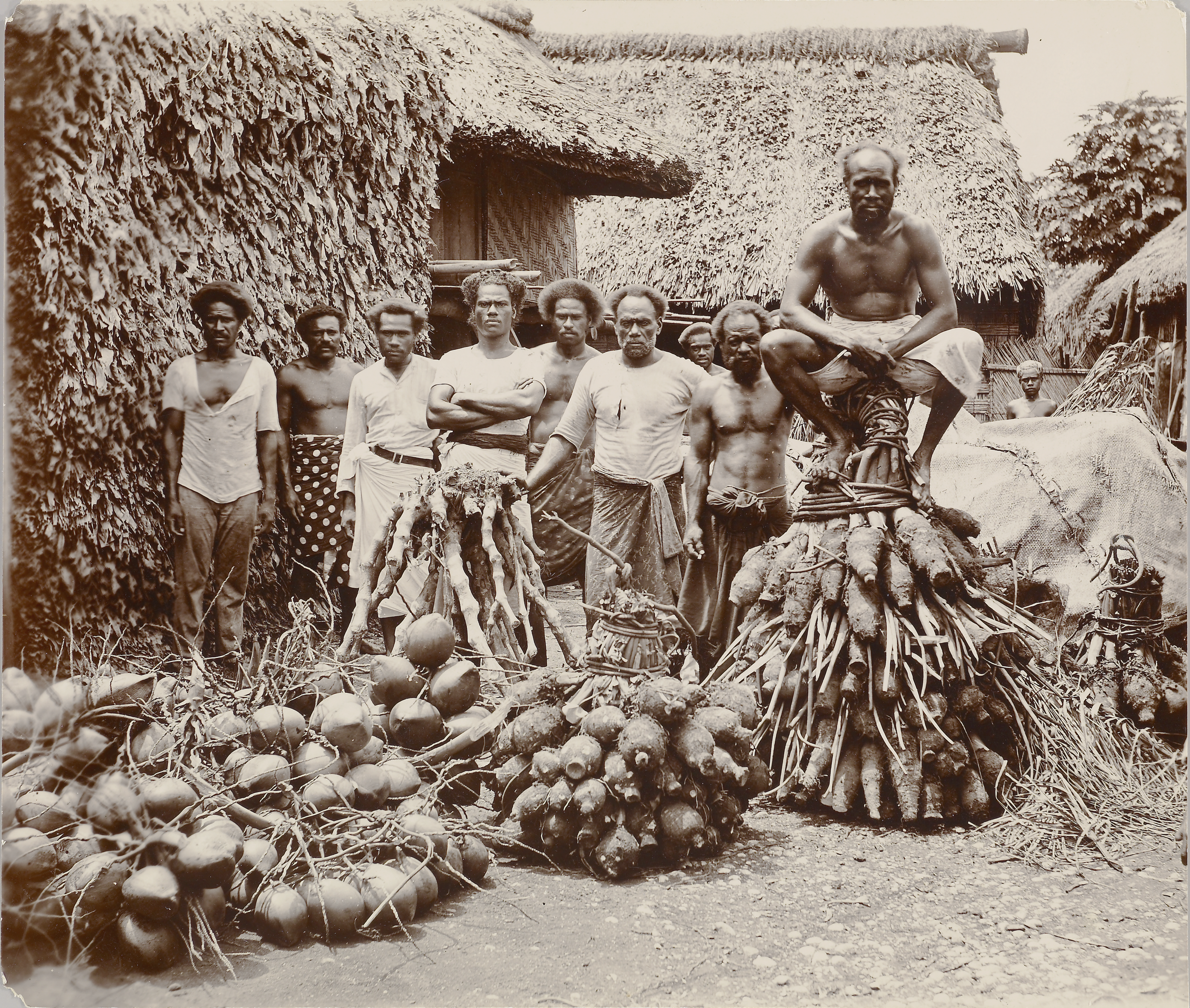
Fijians with coconut, taro and yams, preparing for a feast.

== Snacks ==
Desserts or snacks are common and are eaten in between meals—often for morning tea and afternoon teas. Some common ones include pies filled with custard or pumpkin or pineapple. Steamed puddings are also common but these are rich in sugars and fats. Most homes would use coconut cream, caramelized sugar to give the colour, flour, baking powder as the main ingredients. The pudding mixture is poured into tins and steamed for 1–2 hours. To improve the flavour, sometimes cinnamon or raisins are added. Some nice desserts are also made with cassava. Cassava is first grated and then sugar is added. It is then wrapped in banana leaves and steamed. Burnt sugar pudding (purini or pudini) is one of the most popular puddings in the Fijian cuisine. Vakalolo is a traditional dessert made with cassava, coconut, ginger root, sugar, cloves, then steamed in a banana leaf.

== Ingredients ==
=== Staples ===
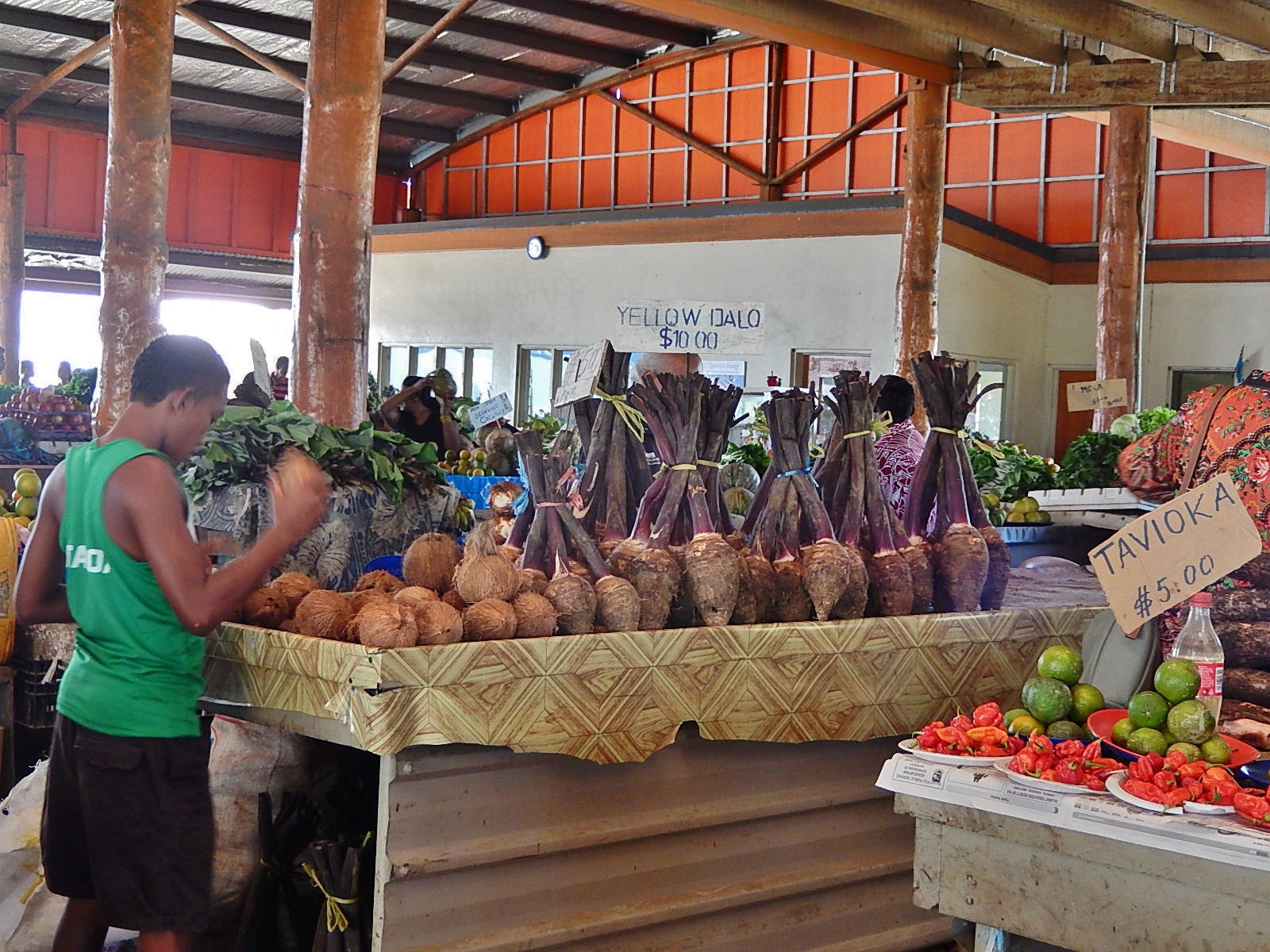
Taro and coconuts for sale in Nadi

Taro is the most important staple for special occasions. It is available in 70 different varieties; some turn pink or yellow or remain white after cooking. It can be grown in any soil conditions. Taro is a rich source of fiber.

Cassava or tavioka has replaced yams and is now the most cultivated and consumed staple crop in Fiji. It is boiled in salt and water until soft and eaten with stews and curries.

Kumala (sweet potato) was not traditionally a staple in the native Fijian diet. It was brought from Papua New Guinea. It is easy to grow and provides a good yield. Now it is the cheapest of all root crops and is eaten by most people in soups, stews or curries.

Breadfruit is a seasonal staple. It is grown in most households in the villages.

Rice was brought by the Indian immigrants and was grown for domestic use around Fiji.

=== Vegetables ===
Taro leaf, rourou, is the most important cash crop for Fijian communities. It is used in everyday meals and also used for ceremonial meals to make palusami.

Bele (Abelmoschus manihot, also hibiscus bele/hibiscus spinach [hibiscus manihot]) is one of the most nutritious traditional vegetables in Oceania. It is a highly nutritious green leafy vegetable grown in almost every household. The leaves are rich sources of vitamins and minerals such as iron and magnesium, pro Vit A and C, also have very high levels of folate, an important nutrient for pregnant and nursing women.

Amaranthus, tubua, is another vegetable commonly eaten in most homes. Other leaves which are eaten include pumpkin, cassava and sweet potato leaves.

=== Coconut ===
Coconut is especially liked by Fijians. It is grown in most coastal areas. Coconut is not only used for food but plays an important role in Fiji's economy.

== Dishes ==
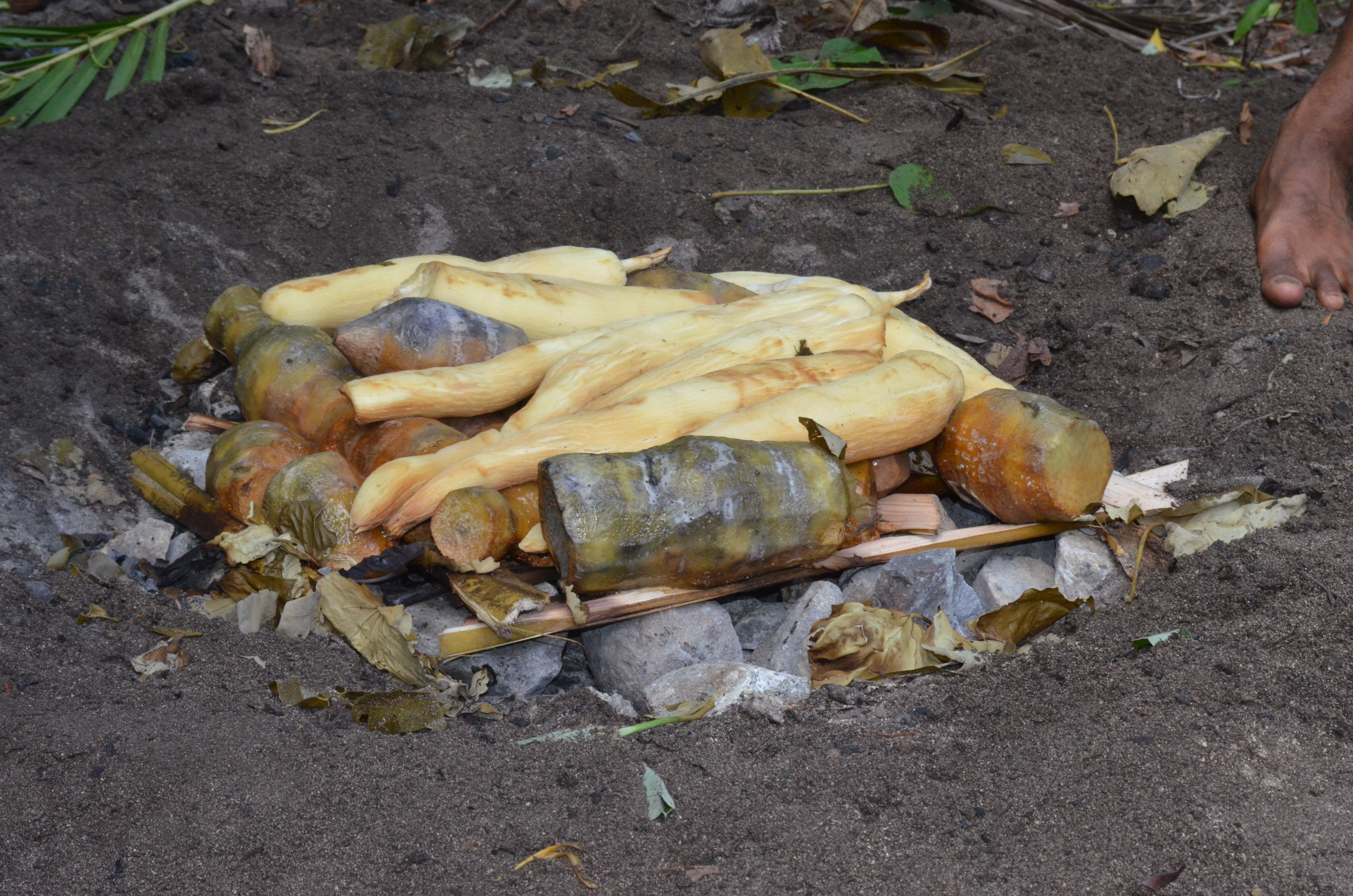
Fijian lovo, a traditional method of cooking food on heated rock underground.

=== Main ===
- Fish suruwa – a Fijian-style fish curry.
- Kokoda – Raw fish marinated in freshly squeezed lemon or lime juice with coconut milk added after it is "cooked" together with finely diced tomatoes, chillies and salt.
- Lovo – A traditional Fijian method of cooking. Food such as meat, fish and vegetables are wrapped in leaves and placed on hot rocks, buried and cooked for several hours.
- Palusami – Parcels made with taro leaves, filled with thick coconut cream, onions, salt and canned meat.
- Rourou – Taro leaf stew.

== Drinks ==
=== Kava/Yaqona ===
Kava is a drink made from powdered roots of yaqona plants. The powder is placed in a muslin cloth and small amounts of water are added to extract the juice out of the powder. Kava is not unique to the Fijian culture; it is widely consumed in other Pacific nations. It has religious and tribal significance and is used as a peace offering known as sevusevu during Fijian functions. Kava consumption can be habit-forming. However, there is no evidence of kava causing physical addiction nor of long-term risks due to its regular use.

Kava is used to calm anxiety, stress, and restlessness, and treat sleep problems. It is also used as a remedy to certain neurological and mental disorders, common colds and other respiratory tract infections, tuberculosis, muscle pain, and as cancer prevention. Some use the drink for urinary tract infections, pain and swelling of the uterus, venereal disease, menstrual discomfort, and as an aphrodisiac. Kava is applied to the skin for skin diseases including leprosy, to promote wound healing, and as a painkiller. It is also used as a mouthwash for canker sores and toothaches.

== Changes in eating patterns over time ==
With changes in eating patterns, there has been a shift towards consumption of more energy-dense foods and decreased intake of fruit and vegetables. The processed foods are more readily available in shops and canteens and are cheaper. They contain high amounts of sugar and sodium which contribute to increasing rates of obesity, diabetes and cardiovascular diseases. However, traditional foods are still valued and used for special occasions. Nutrition research involving children show 90% of children consume sugar-sweetened beverages on a daily basis and 74% consume less fruit and vegetables.

== Fast food ==
Both local and foreign fast food chains have started to enter the Fijian market since the late 1990s. There are McDonald's (locally called Maccas) and Burger King, while Kentucky Fried Chicken and Super Eagle Boys Pizza formerly operated in Fiji.

== See also ==
- Oceanic cuisine
