= Tokelauan cuisine =

Culinary traditions of Tokelau

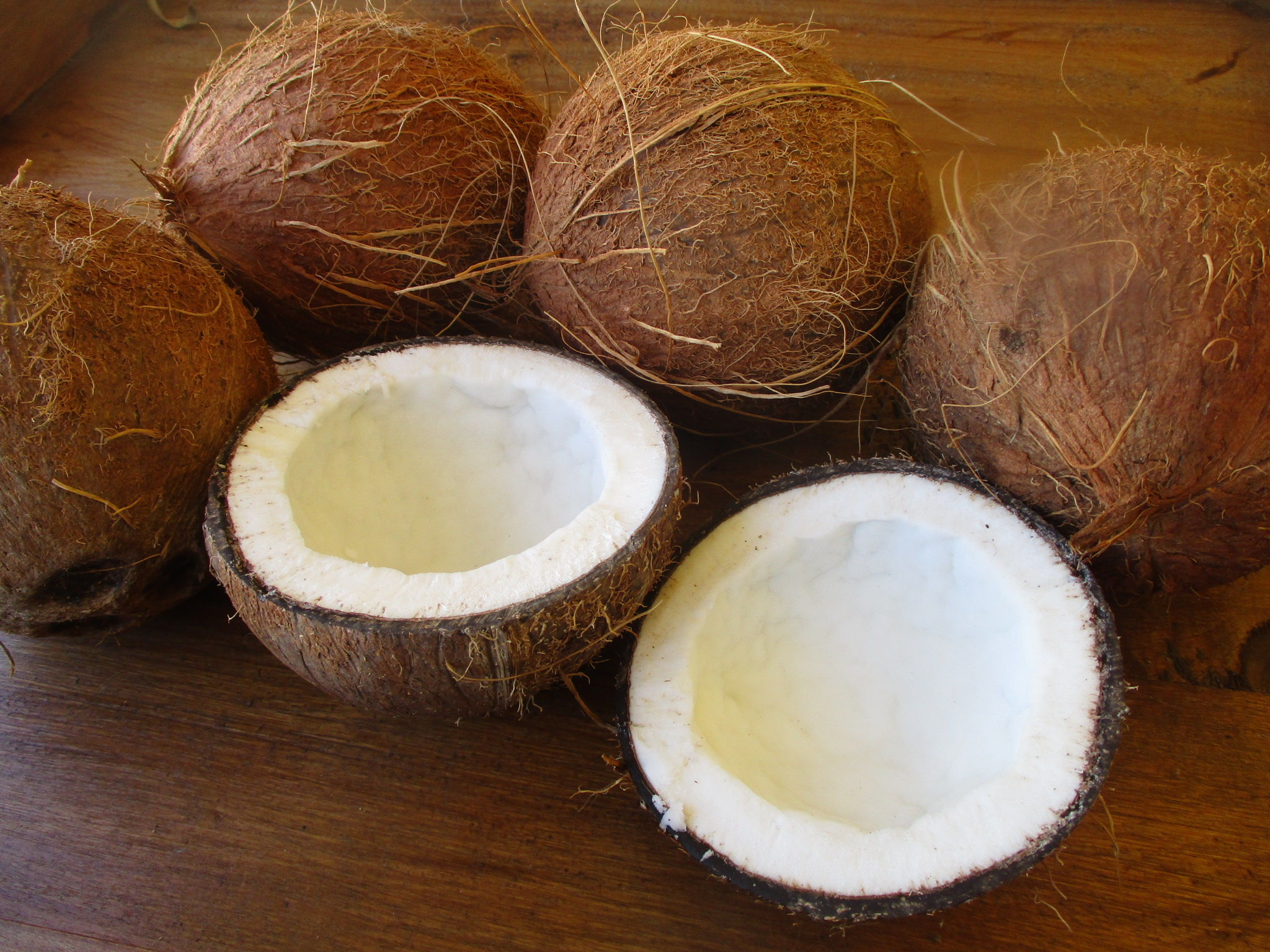
- Coconut, an important staple of Tokelau
- Country or region: Tokelau
- National dishes: Ota
- National drink: Kava, coconut water

Tokelauan cuisine (Meakai tokelau) is the culinary traditions and practices of the island nation of Tokelau.

== Ingredients ==
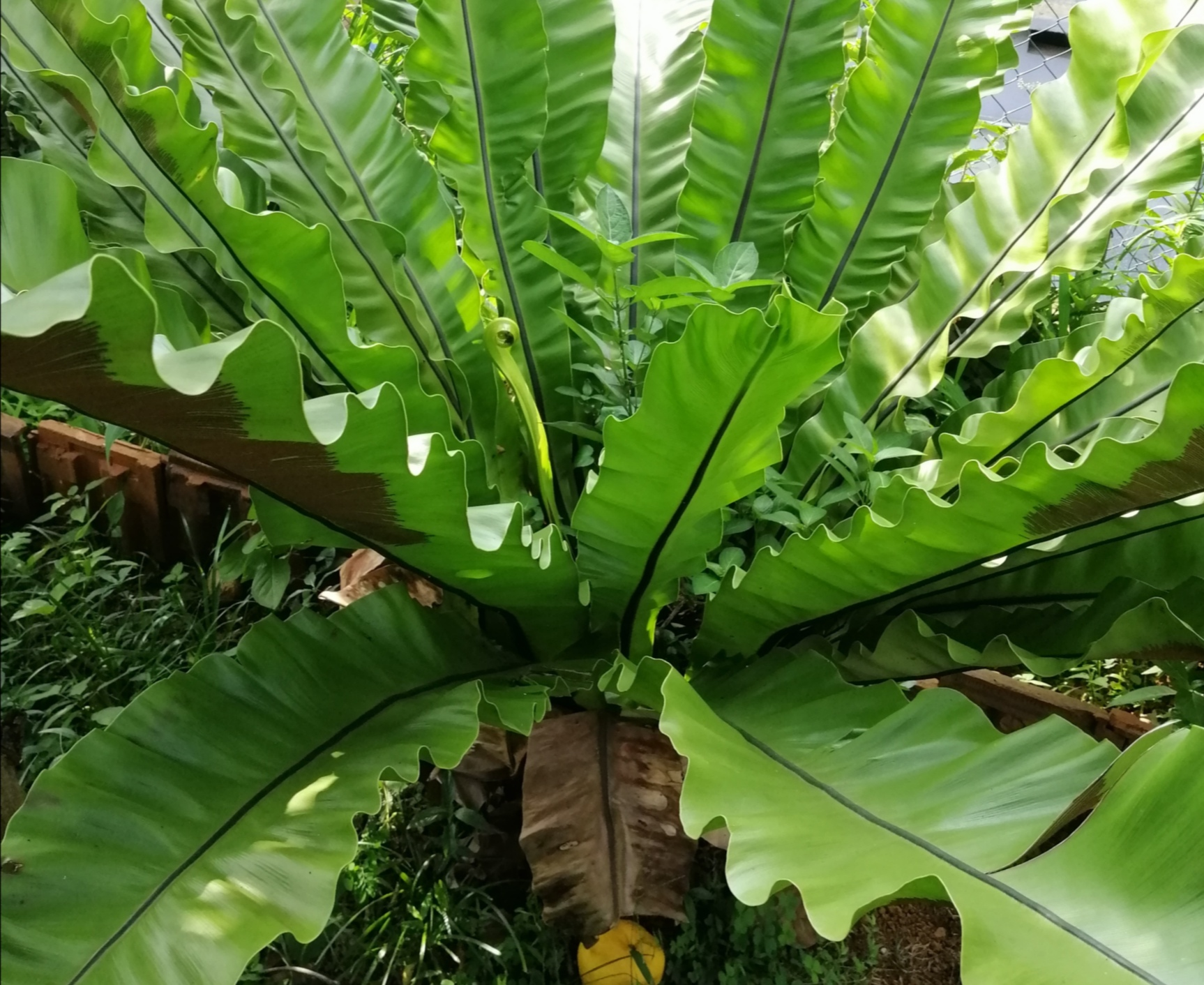
Bird's-nest fern (laumea), an important leafy vegetable in Tokelau

The original food crops of the Tokelauans were coconut (niu), pandanus (fala), noni (nonu), dyer's fig (mati) and arrowroot (māhoā) Of these, coconut and pandanus fruit were considered the major food crops while noni, dyer's fig and arrowroot were considered famine food, eaten only during times of scarcity. Coconut in particular was a very important component of the diet, making up the majority of the Tokelauans' energy intake. The coconut drupe was prepared and consumed in various forms; the meat, milk and oil are all used extensively in many meal preparations. Sap from the cut flower spathe was also collected and is consumed as a beverage or boiled down into a red syrup (kaleve kukula) that was used as a sweetener for various dishes.

== Foods and dishes ==
- Lolo fala; a pudding made from pandanus fruit pulp and coconut cream, sometimes thickened with starch.
- Ota; a raw fish dish.
- Puleleti; a confection made from desiccated coconut and coconut syrup rolled into balls.
- Puta; a round doughnut.
- Tatuna; coconut cream residue separated during the process of making coconut oil, usually formed into balls and eaten with pandanus fruit.
- Tupelepele; a gelatinous food made from grated coconut meat and coconut water, thickened with starch.
- Vaihalo; a porridge made from coconut.
