= Lūʻau (food) =

Traditional Polynesian dish of cooked taro leaves and stems

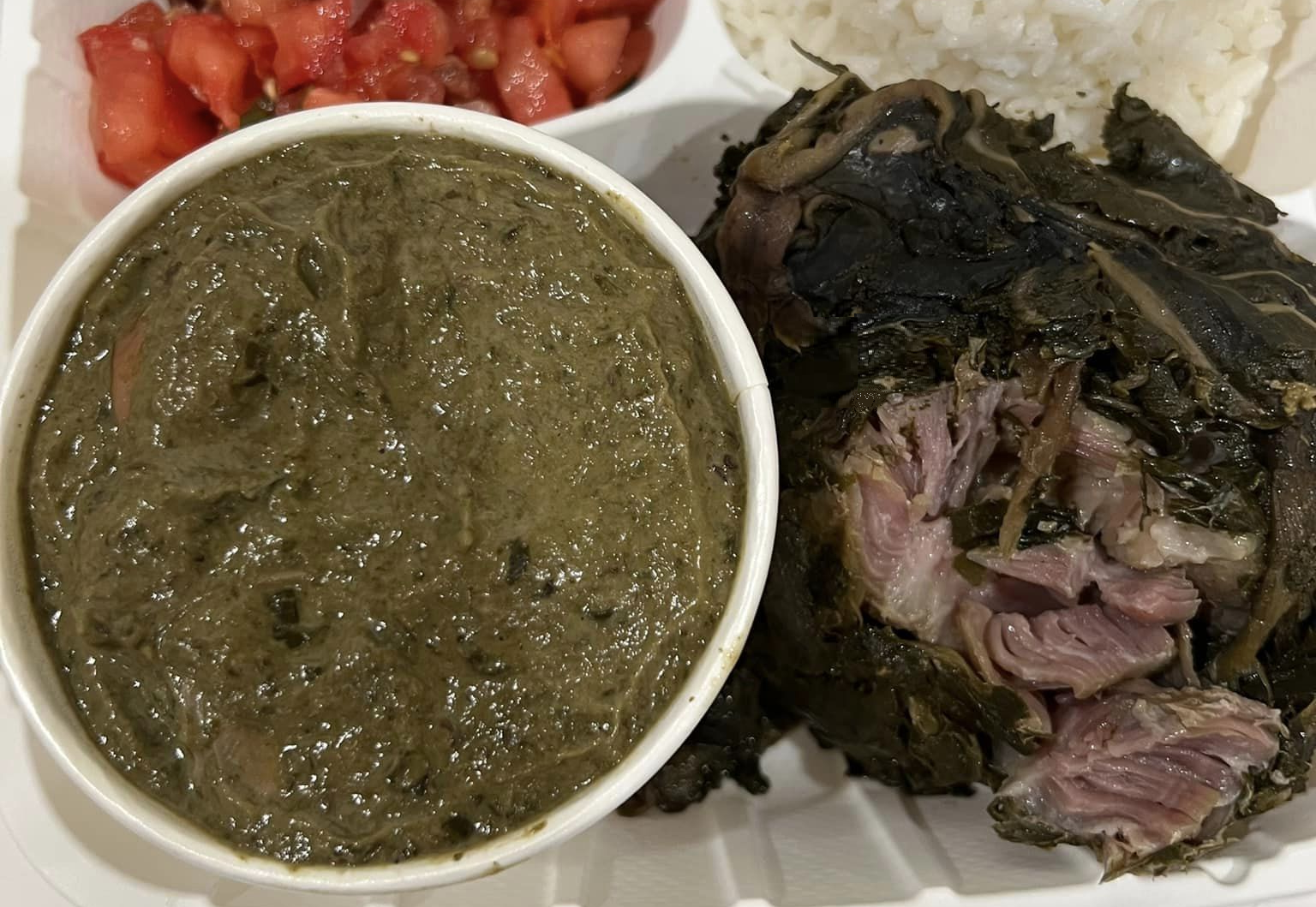
- left to right: Lūʻau, laulau
- Alternative names: Rukau, rourou, laulau, lū, laulau, palusami, hāhā, poulet fāfā
- Type: Stew
- Course: Entree
- Place of origin: Hawaii, Samoa, Tonga, Fiji, French Polynesia, Cook Islands
- Region or state: Polynesia
- Serving temperature: Hot
- Main ingredients: Taro (leaves and stems)

Lūʻau, luʻau, laulau, lū, rourou, rukau, fāfā, hāhā, and palusami are all related dishes found throughout Polynesia based on the use of taro leaves as a primary ingredient. While taro is known worldwide as a root vegetable, the leaves with stems can be consumed as well. The base recipe is vegetarian. Most often, coconut milk was added, and later meat or seafood. The texture of the dish ranges from a thick soup to a dense cake.

== Etymology ==
- "Laulau" (Proto-Austronesian) describes "basket or leaves for serving or carrying food; to serve food" with cognates: laulau, rourou.
- "Luu" (Proto-Polynesian) describes "taro leaves as food" with cognates: lū.
- "Luukau" (Nuclear Polynesian) describes "edible greens" with cognates: lūʻau, luʻau, rukau.
- "Faa" (Proto-Austronesian) describes "(plant) stalks" with cognates: fāfā, hāhā.

== History ==
Taro is one of the most ancient, cultivated crops. Thought to be native to India and Southeast Asia, taro were carried into the Pacific Islands by Austronesian peoples from around 1300 BC, where they became a staple crop of Polynesians. Although associated as root vegetable, all parts of the taro was utilized.

In addition, they brought along with them pigs, chickens, and Polynesian dogs for protein. When the Western navigators arrived, they introduced foods like onions, tomatoes, corned meats and various spices. Colonialism brought with them something that would change Polynesian diets—canned goods, including the highly prized corned beef. Natural disasters brought in food aid from New Zealand, Australia, and the US, then world wars in the mid-20th century, foreign foods became a bigger part of daily diets while retaining ancestral foods like taro and coconuts.

Building an earth oven is very labor-intensive, often made for larger festivities or religious ceremonies. Since earthenware was not known throughout ancient Polynesia, stews were often steamed in calabash bowls or coconut shells but were not efficient conductors of heat. For daily consumption, it was easier to cook taro leaves into parcels for smaller ovens. Taro leaves contain calcium oxalate, which in its raw form can cause serious irritation to the mouth and throat if not cooked thoroughly.

== Variations ==
=== Cook Islands ===
In the Cook Islands, rukau refers to both leafy greens (most often rukau dalo, the leaves of the taro plant) and the dishes they can be made into, both in stews, as a parcel, or baked in the oven like a casserole. Coconut milk is widely used along with fish, lamb, and corned beef in rukau dishes. Rukau viti (Abelmoschus manihot) is a popular alternative to rukau dalo.

In a modern twist, rukau are used as a filling for ravioli and also into pastries known as "rukau pies" in Auckland.

=== Fiji ===
In Fijian cuisine, rourou (or roro) is stew of dalo (taro) leaves. Taro leaves (whole or shredded) are typically added to the stewing liquid of coconut milk without parboiling. Aromatics such as onions and garlic are commonly used as well as spices. Proteins include canned corned beef or tuna, fresh lamb. The stew is often served with cassava (boiled or fried into chips), or with roti in a manner similar to saag by way of Indo-Fijians.

Another method involves stuffing fresh taro leaves with a meat filling that are tightly rolled (or made into balls) then stewed in pot in a manner similar to dolma or stuffed cabbage. These balls are sometimes referred to as rourou balls or wacipoki. When these balls are made into parcels, they are often called palusami, influenced by nearby Samoa. Another wacipoki technique is forming them into patties with a mixture of chopped parboiled taro leaves, onions, and seasonings that are pan-fried, and simmered in a coconut milk sauce. Because of the rising prices of taro (and food in general), instant noodles is sometimes mixed into the wacipoki as a filler.

=== French Polynesia ===
Poulet fāfā is a thick stew of poulet (French lit. "chicken") and fāfā (Tahitian transl. "taro greens or shoots"). Influenced by French cuisine, contemporary recipes often feature the chicken as the primary ingredient, while the taro leaves stewed in coconut milk acts as a sauce. Spinach is often substituted for taro leaves. Cubed chicken breasts are typical, but sometimes whole leg quarters are served. Onions are typically added, along with garlic or ginger. Bouillon or curry powder is sometimes added as a seasoning. It is eaten with roasted taro, breadfruit, sweet potatoes, or rice.

=== Hawaii ===
In lūʻau stew, lūʻau refers to the young leaves of the kalo (taro) plant, though it generally means taro leaves as an ingredient. The leaves are parboiled, strained, chopped, and combined with the cooked (fresh) meat—octopus ("squid"), chicken, beef, or pork—that are sautéed with onions. For thicker stews containing "squid" or chicken, coconut milk and sugar are added. However, stews containing beef or pork usually omit the coconut milk and can be braised along the cooking of the taro leaves, seasoned with salt, salt cod ("butterfish"), or salted salmon. It is generally eaten with rice.

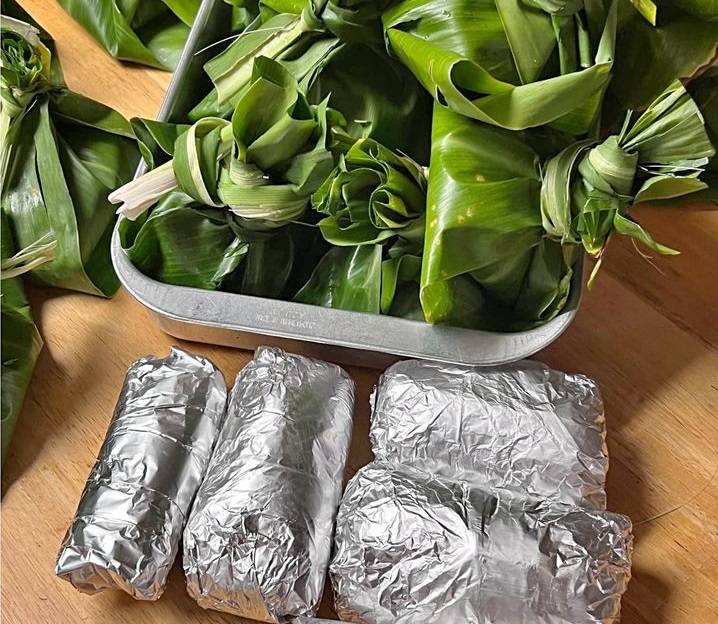
uncooked laulau, ti leaf and foil wrapped

Laulau (lit. "leaf leaf") refers to the ti leaves that are traditionally used to wrap the food within it. Whole mature larger (and younger) taro leaves wrap around large cubes of pork shoulder or belly, beef, or chicken thighs. A piece of "butterfish" is traditionally added with the other meats as seasoning. A piece of sweet potato is sometimes added. It is eaten with poi or rice. Unlike its Polynesian variations, this dish does not contain any coconut milk or aromatics like onions or garlic, or other spices. However, similar dishes like Samoan palusami that are made in Hawaii sometimes use the vernacular laulau when speaking with a non-Samoan person.

Hā, the stems or stalk of the taro, is commonly added to lūʻau and laulau as a filler. As a dish on its own, stems are peeled and sliced for a stew called hāhā. It is seasoned with salt, dried shrimp, or "butterfish" or salt-cured salmon. Hāhā can be combined with pork or beef that is usually cooked separately from the stew. Generally, cooking the stems of the taro, by itself, takes the least amount of time because it contains the least amount of calcium oxalate. This dish does not contain coconut milk either.

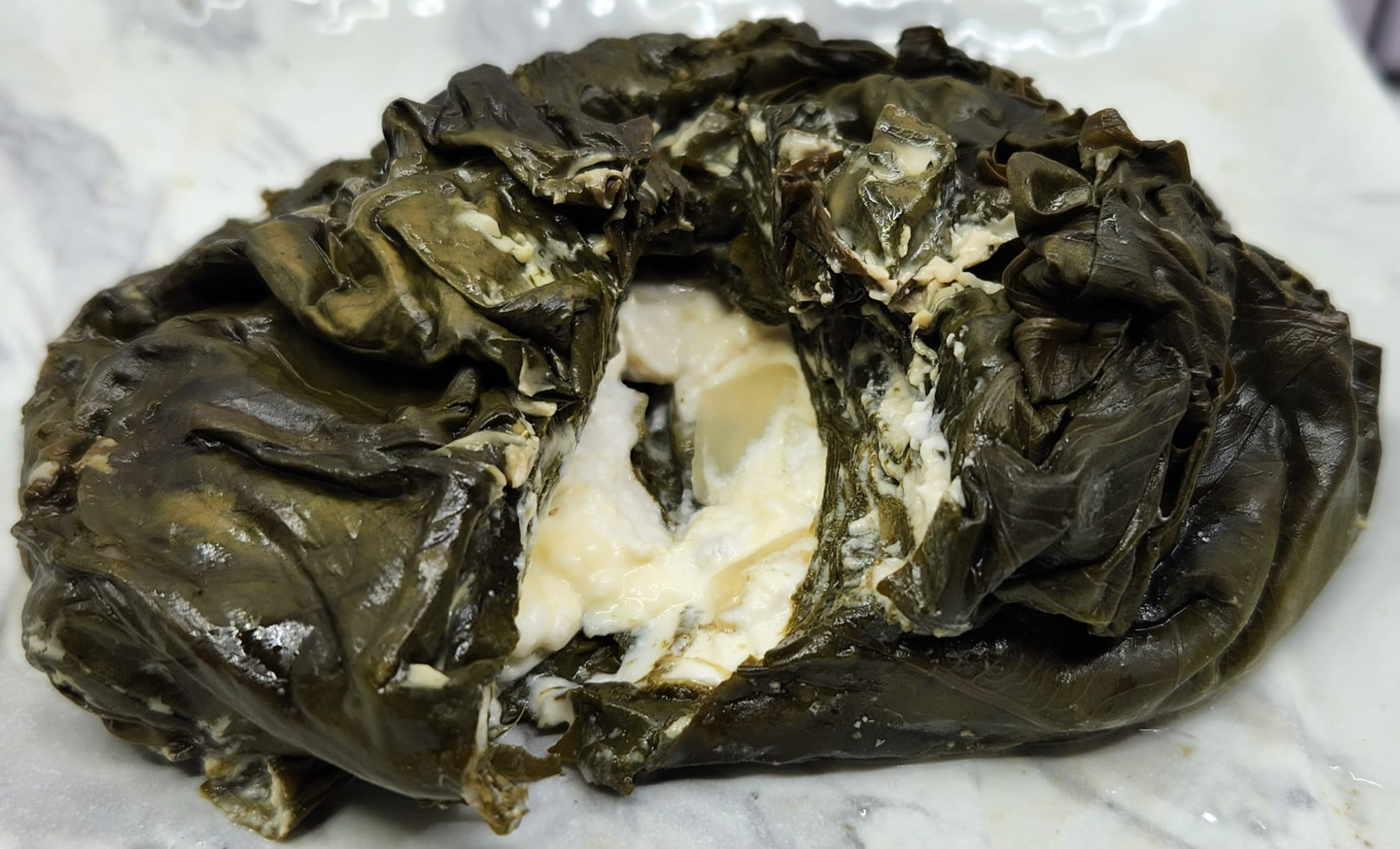
cooked palusami showing coconut cream and onion filling

=== Samoa ===
Palusami is believed to be a contraction of the phrase, "paʻapaʻa (luʻau) sami" ("to cook (taro leaves) with sea water on fire")" or palu (luʻau) sami" ("mixed (taro leaves) with sea water"). The dish is sometimes referred to as luʻau.

Palusami, and like much of Samoan cuisine, is noted for its richness, or lolo (lit. "fatty")—rich foods that often contain a good amount of thicker coconut cream (not to be confused with sweetened "cream of coconut"). Beef, or povi ( lit. "bovine"), is the protein of choice in the form of brined povi masima (lit. "salted beef") or canned pīsupo (lit. "pea soup," general term for canned foods). Palusami is prepared by laying out a few taro leaves and spooning an amount of beef and onions into the center with a healthy amount of coconut cream and bundled with foil then steamed.

=== Tonga ===
Lū talo are typically prepared in parcels, in Tonga. Two popular versions are lū pulu (lit. "bull") refers to beef, and lū sipi (lit. "sheep") refers to mutton or lamb. Fresh meat can be used, corned (wet brine) masima or canned meats kapa are typical. Horse meat, hoosi, is also a delicacy. Coconut cream is often mixed into the meat, especially with canned meats, to form a paste that easily dollops. Chopped onions are common additions, sometimes tomatoes. Lū moa (chicken) and lū ika (fish) are made as well. The parcels are traditionally wrapped with banana leaves but it is more common to use foil. Kapisi pulu is a similar variant using kapisi (lit. "cabbage").

== Modern day ==
Newer technology has made it easier to reduce the cooking time of taro. Dishes can be cooked stovetop in a steamer or baked in an oven, or in a pressure cooker and crock pot in temperature-controlled setting. Today, foods like laulau, palusami, or lū pulu, foods which are typically made into bundles, sometimes bypass the tedious chore of wrapping by making a casserole-like dish in large quantities making it more akin to its stew counterpart.

In areas outside where taro leaves not sold or found, expatriates living abroad use in its place spinach, Swiss chard, collard greens, kale or other leafy green vegetable. And where ti or banana leaves cannot be found, aluminium foil, parchment paper, and corn husk are used.

== See also ==
- List of ancient dishes
- List of stews
- Laing (food), a similar native dish from the Philippines
- Callaloo, a similar native dish from the Caribbean
- Lili'uokalani Protestant Church, which is known for its version of the dish
