= Vanuatuan cuisine =

Cuisine in Vanuatu

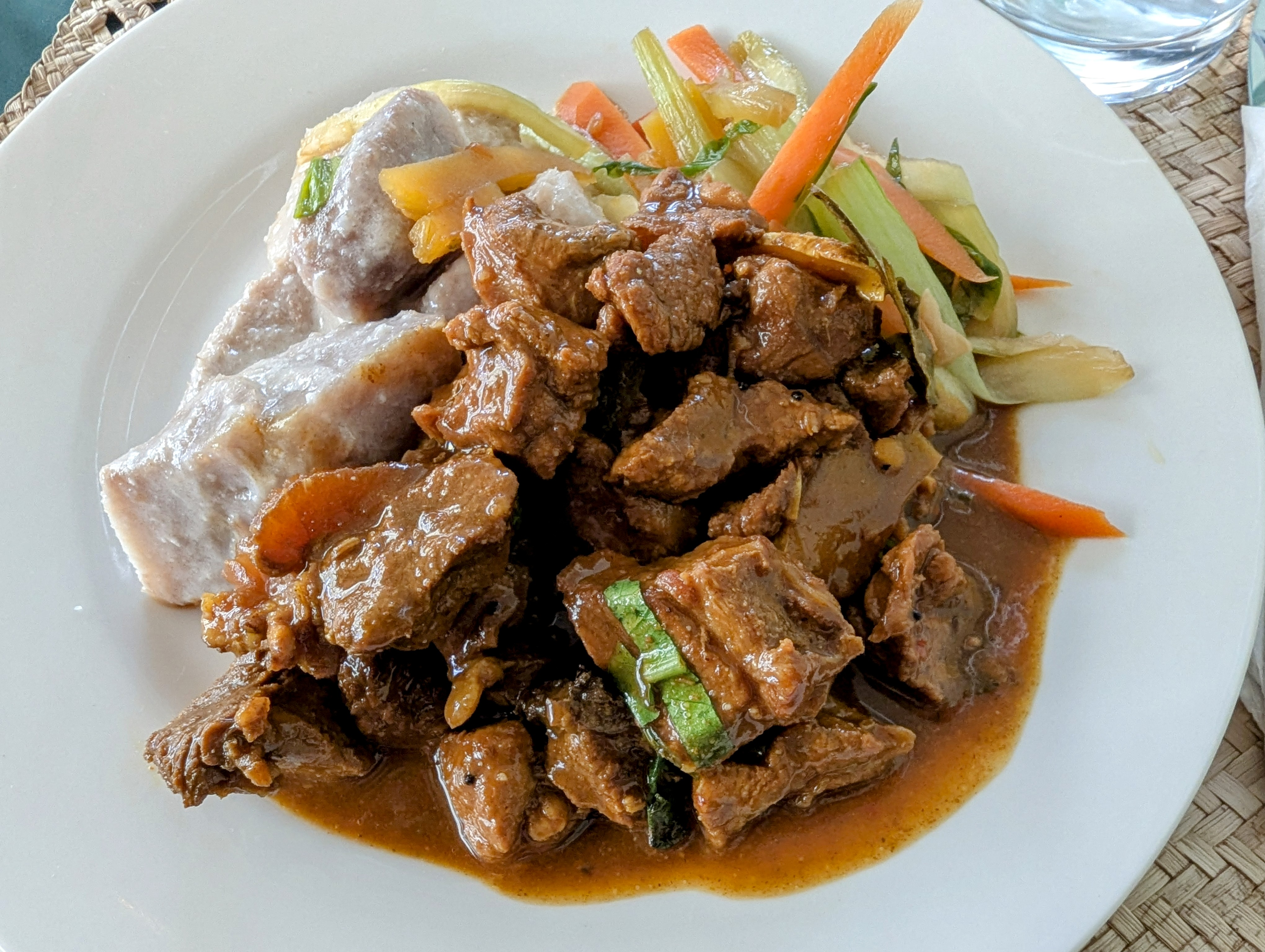
- Vanuatu beef curry with taro boiled in coconut milk and island vegetables
- Country or region: Vanuatu
- National dish: Laplap
- National drink: Kava

The cuisine of Vanuatu (Bislama: aelan kakae, lit. 'island food') incorporates fish, root vegetables such as taro and yams, fruits, and vegetables. Most island families grow food in their gardens, and food shortages are rare. Papayas, pineapples, mangoes, plantains, and sweet potatoes are abundant through much of the year. Coconut milk and coconut cream are used to flavour many dishes. Most food is cooked using hot stones or through boiling and steaming; little food is fried. Since Vanuatu is one of the few South Pacific regions influenced by the outside world, Vanuatu's food has a multicultural nature.

== Core ingredients ==
Vanuatu foods use several core ingredients including yam, taro, banana, coconut, sugarcane, tropical nuts, pigs, greens, fowl and seafood. Native people in Vanuatu usually grow most of their food except luxury foods such as rice or tinned fish.

== Traditional drink ==
Kava, a traditional psychoactive non-alcoholic drink, is extremely popular in Vanuatu. A once-prestigious beverage brewed from Piper methysticum, it is commonly drunk at dusk, before dinner, mostly by men but increasingly by women. While it has mild narcotic and relaxing effects on the individual, it is mostly appreciated for the relaxed social atmosphere it is traditionally associated with, both in urban and rural areas, in the context of the nakamal.

Kava is a well-known beverage commonly drunk across the South Pacific, as it is strongly tied to sacred traditions and custom beliefs. However, in some social groups, the original function and etiquette that accompanies the activity has somewhat lost its reverence. It can be abused.

== Traditional foods ==
The national dish of Vanuatu is lap lap. Laplap is a baked pudding. It is made up of grated yam, banana, manioc, or taro that is mixed with coconut milk and salt, wrapped up in banana leaves, then baked in an earth oven or hot volcanic stones. There is a variety of lap lap styles from island to island. Malekula has a unique laplap baking technique called 'sosor', in which a glowing hot volcanic stone is placed in the center of the unbaked pudding, with chicken wings, onion and tomato on top of the stone. They then squeeze coconut milk over the whole pudding, wrap it up and bake it. Once baked, the sosor is opened, the stone removed and all the meat is cooked (steamed from the coconut milk), a well is made in the centre of the pudding and more coconut milk is squeezed out as a dipping sauce. The local markets often have stall hawkers selling local laplap with various toppings such as chicken, beef, octopus or fried fish.

Another popular dish is simboro, a steamed roll of grated banana, manioc, yam, taro, or flour that is wrapped in banana leaves and covered in coconut milk.

Flying foxes are also captured, kept in cages, and eaten as a stew in some islands.

The traditional diet is also rich in marine animals. Many of the rural villages that live near the coastal areas (or lake and rivers) are well-known skilled fishermen, and incorporate all manner of shellfish, deep sea and reef fish into their daily household meals. Locals are celebrated as skillful fishermen if they are able to catch deep sea fish such as Tuna, Barracuda or Marlin, with traditional methods. Other types of marine life commonly eaten are red emperor, parrotfish, cod, trevally, common periwinkle shellfish, lobster and sandcrabs. The coconut crab is considered a delicacy in Vanuatu. However, many restaurants in Vanuatu have stopped serving this dish as the crab is at risk of becoming an extinct species.

For feasts, a dish called bunya or bunia is prepared by wrapping meat, vegetables and coconut milk in a bundle of banana leaves and steaming it with hot stones or an underground oven.

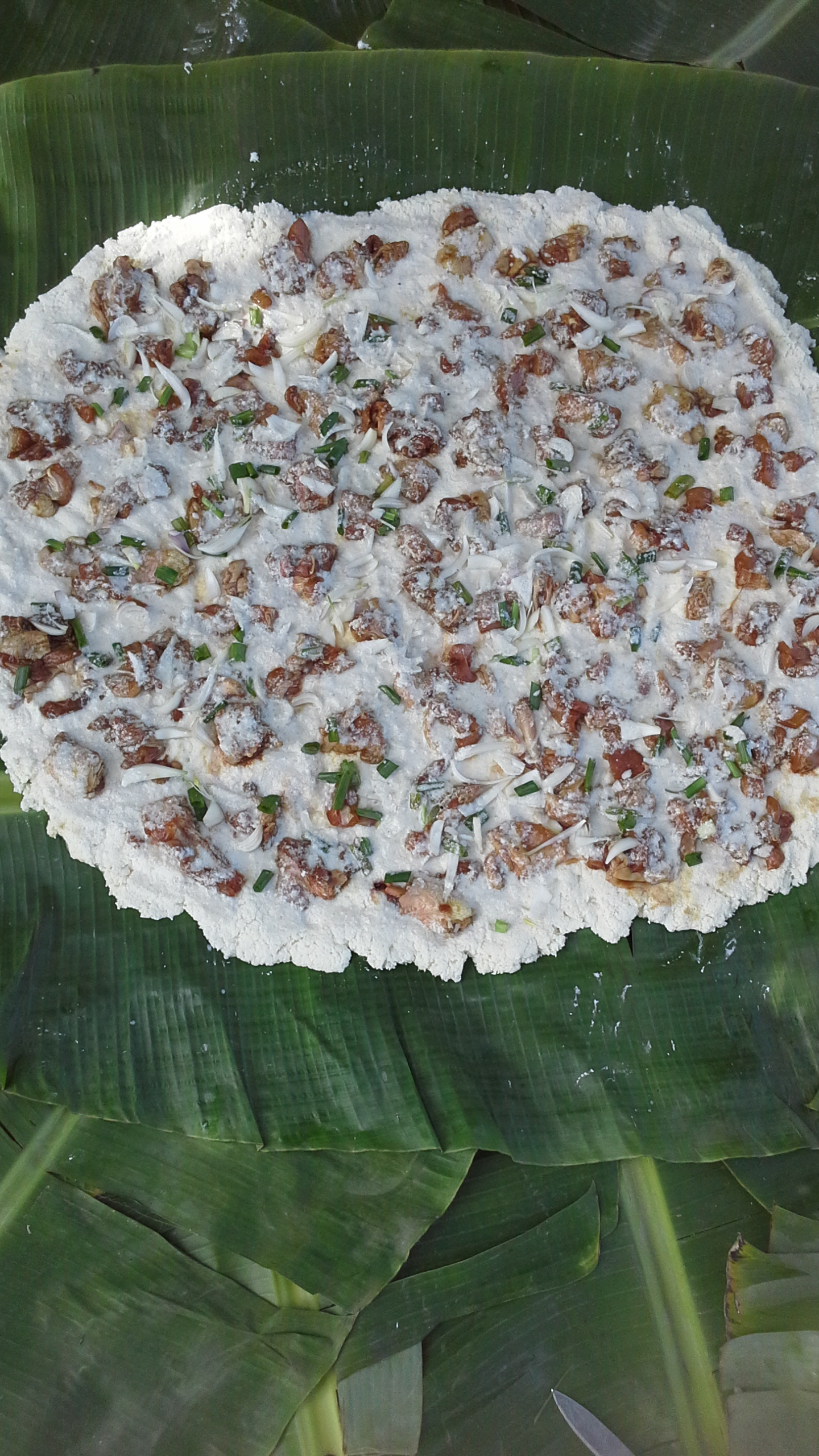
Laplap after cooking

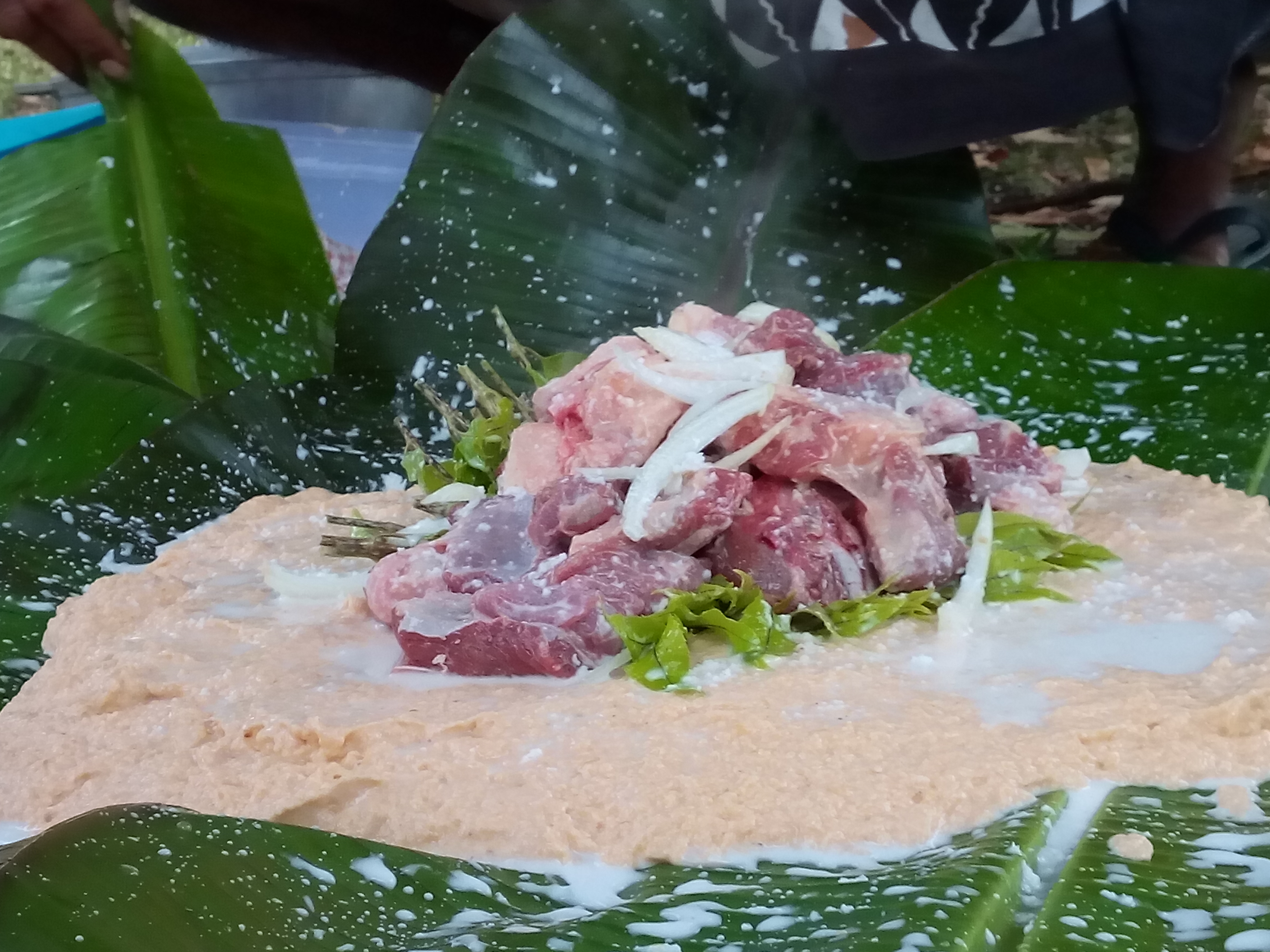
Laplap sosor, a variant of the national dish from Malekula island, before cooking

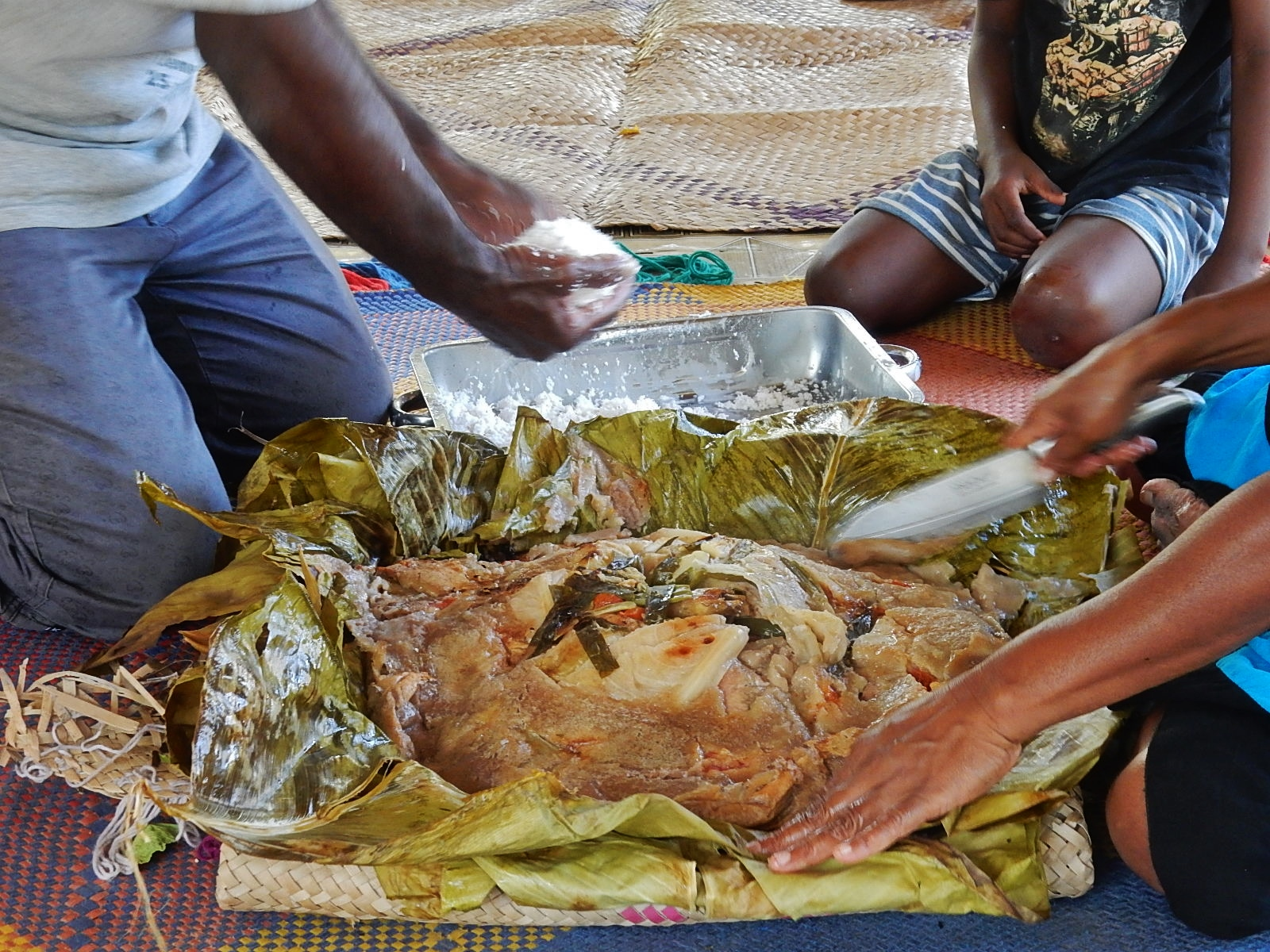
Bunya after cooking

== Modern Vanuatu cuisine ==
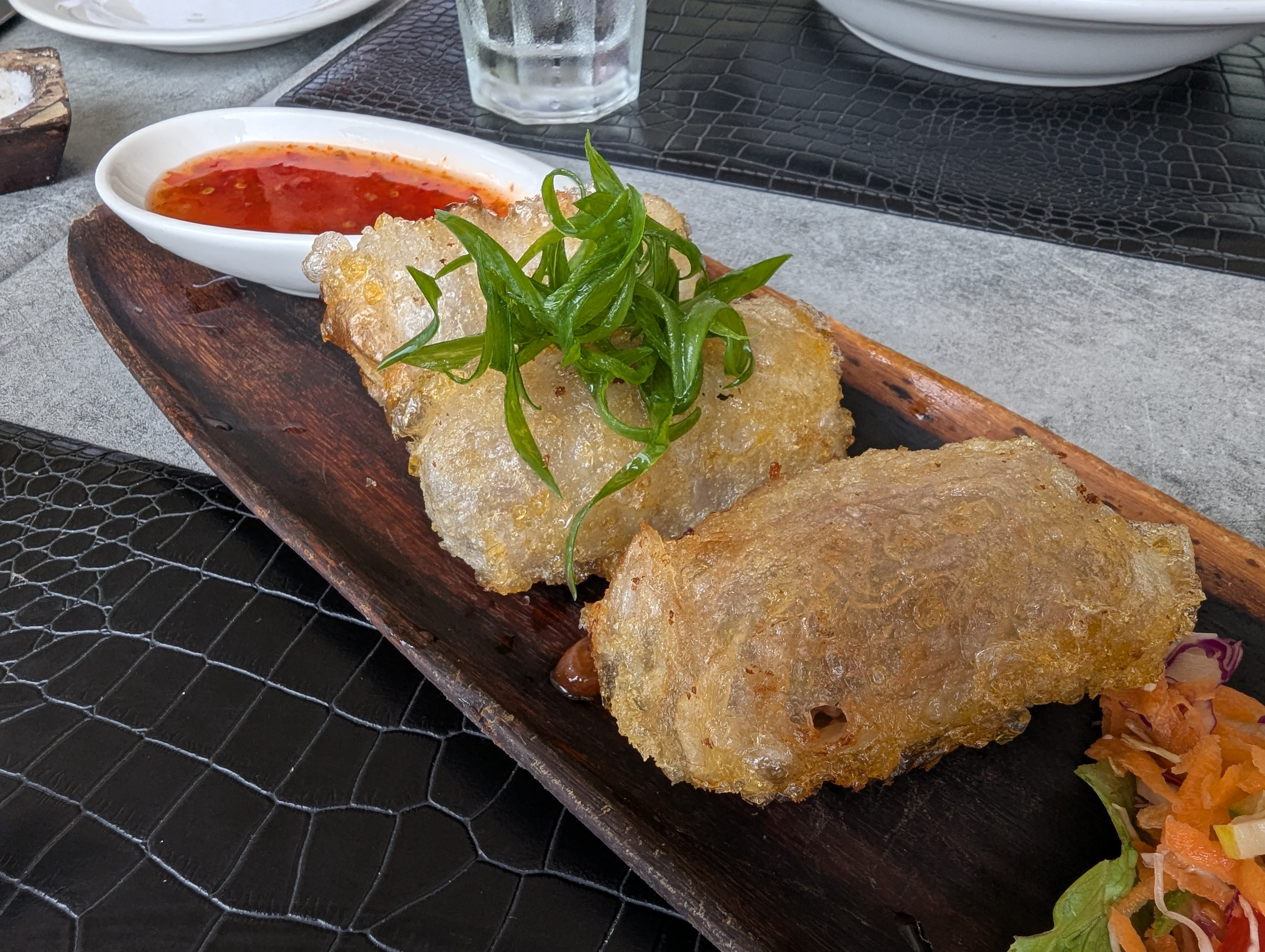
Nems (deep-fried spring rolls), stuffed with minced beef

During the French-British colonial times, there was an influx of migrated groups of people from other countries, some of which were also French- and British-colonised countries. Some of these groups were from Vietnam, Wallis and Futuna, Fiji, China, New Zealand, and Australia; others were European expatriates. The migrated populations tended to live in the capitals of Vanuatu, such as Port Vila and Luganville, and hence introduced foreign foods such as French bread, Vietnamese spring rolls known as nems, and fried doughnuts, known as gateau huit (deep-fried and shaped into the number '8').

The booming tourism industry has also contributed to the rise in Western food bars and restaurants in the nation's urban areas. Common Western foods such as chicken and chips and pizza, and Asian cuisine such as fried rice and stir-fried meat dishes, can be found in many restaurants but are considered a luxury in the locals' diets.

With the ever-increasing migration from regional/local islands into the urban capital in the nation, many people have left behind the way of living off the land as they settle in rented-dwellings in crowded suburbs. With only little land for farming and agricultural sustenance, on top of the demands of modern working-life, many urban dwellers turn to convenient food products e.g. canned processed foods, to feed their households. The introduction of foreign, processed products have also been identified as a contributing factor to the rise of Non-communicable disease.

There are not many large land animals that have been domesticated for food. The pig is a sacred animal in tradition and is usually eaten in significant feasts and events. It is thought to have been brought to the land from various older migrations, like the Lapita people, with poultry. Cows and goats were introduced by earlier European colonists, but cattle has become a growing export industry for the nation. Beef and poultry have been part of the household diet.

Tusker beer, launched in 1989, has become a popular symbol of Vanuatu identity.
