= Pascuense cuisine =

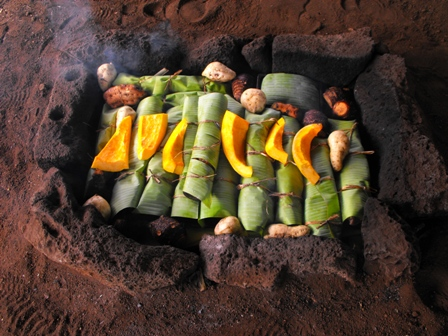
- A Pascuense umu, meat and vegetables roasted in an earth oven
- Country or region: Easter Island
- National dish: Umu

Pascuense cuisine, otherwise known as Easter Island cuisine or Rapa Nui cuisine, incorporates the influences of the indigenous Rapa Nui people and Latin America. Notable ingredients include seafood such as fish, octopus (heke), eel, sea snails (pipi) and crustaceans (lobster), as well as sweet potato, taro, banana, pineapple, coconut, pumpkin, and poultry, pork and lamb meat.

Traditional foods include umu, meat, fish, vegetables and fruit wrapped in banana leaves and roasted in an umu pae, an earth oven. Po'e, pudding made of mashed bananas, pumpkin and flour is baked in the umu pae as well. Other favorite dishes are tunu ahi, fish grilled on hot stones, or ceviche. Pascuense cuisine also includes meat dishes, such as pork or mutton ribs.

== History ==
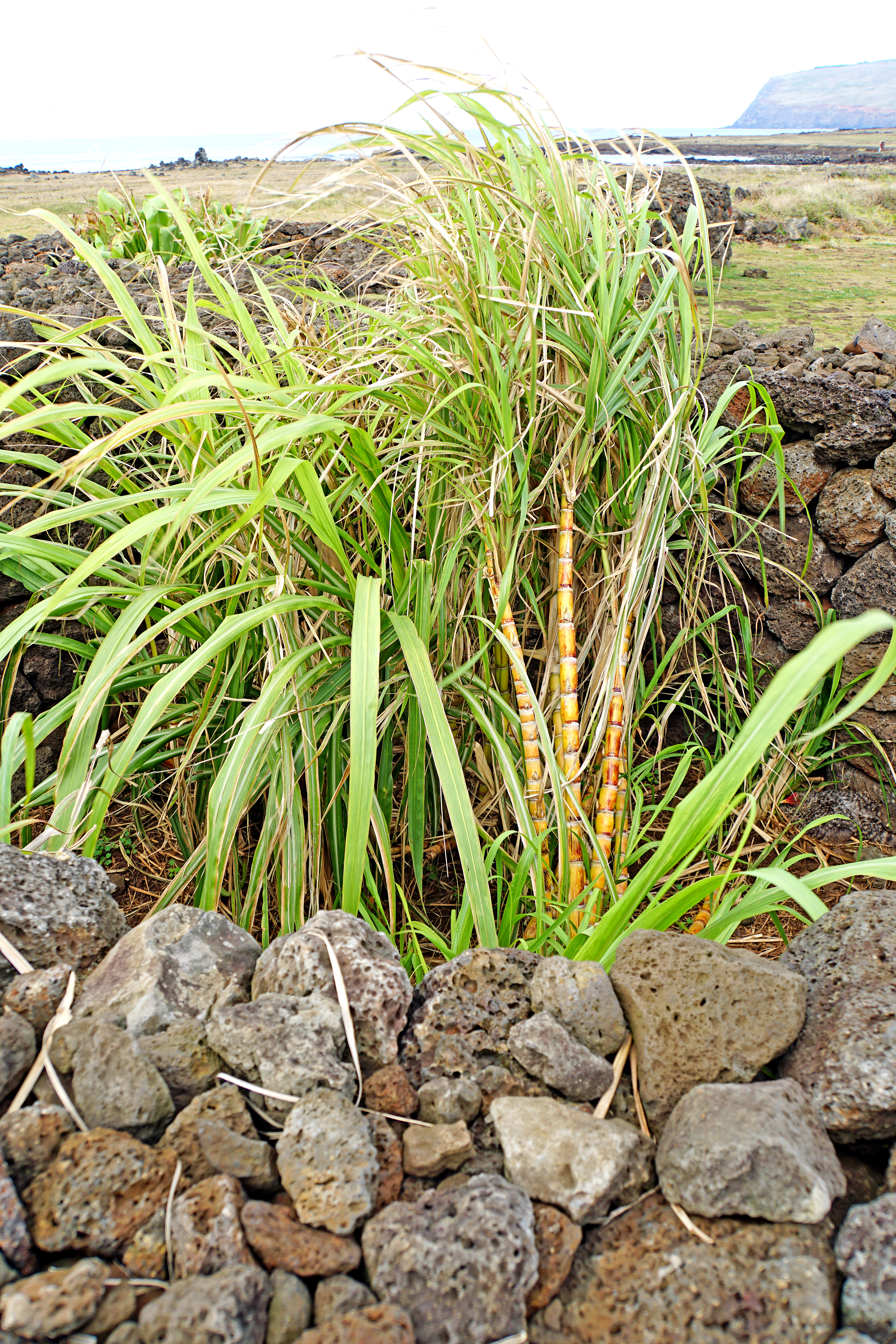
Sugarcane growing in Manavai

Easter Island was first settled in 800CE-1200CE by Polynesian explorers from Eastern Polynesia, bringing numerous plant and animal species with them. Some crops such as breadfruit, coconut and kava failed to grow in the subtropical climate. The crops that did thrive were sweet potato (kumara), taro, yams (uhi), bananas (maika), calabash (hue), ti, sugarcane (toa), giant taro (kape), turmeric (pua), arrowroot (pia) and Malay apple (haia), as well as chickens (moa) and rats (kiore). Out of the crops introduced, the sweet potato was considered the most important. Vast areas of forest were cleared for agriculture, but with the island's exposure to wind and periodic droughts, circular stone walls called Manavai were erected to shelter crops and conserve moisture.

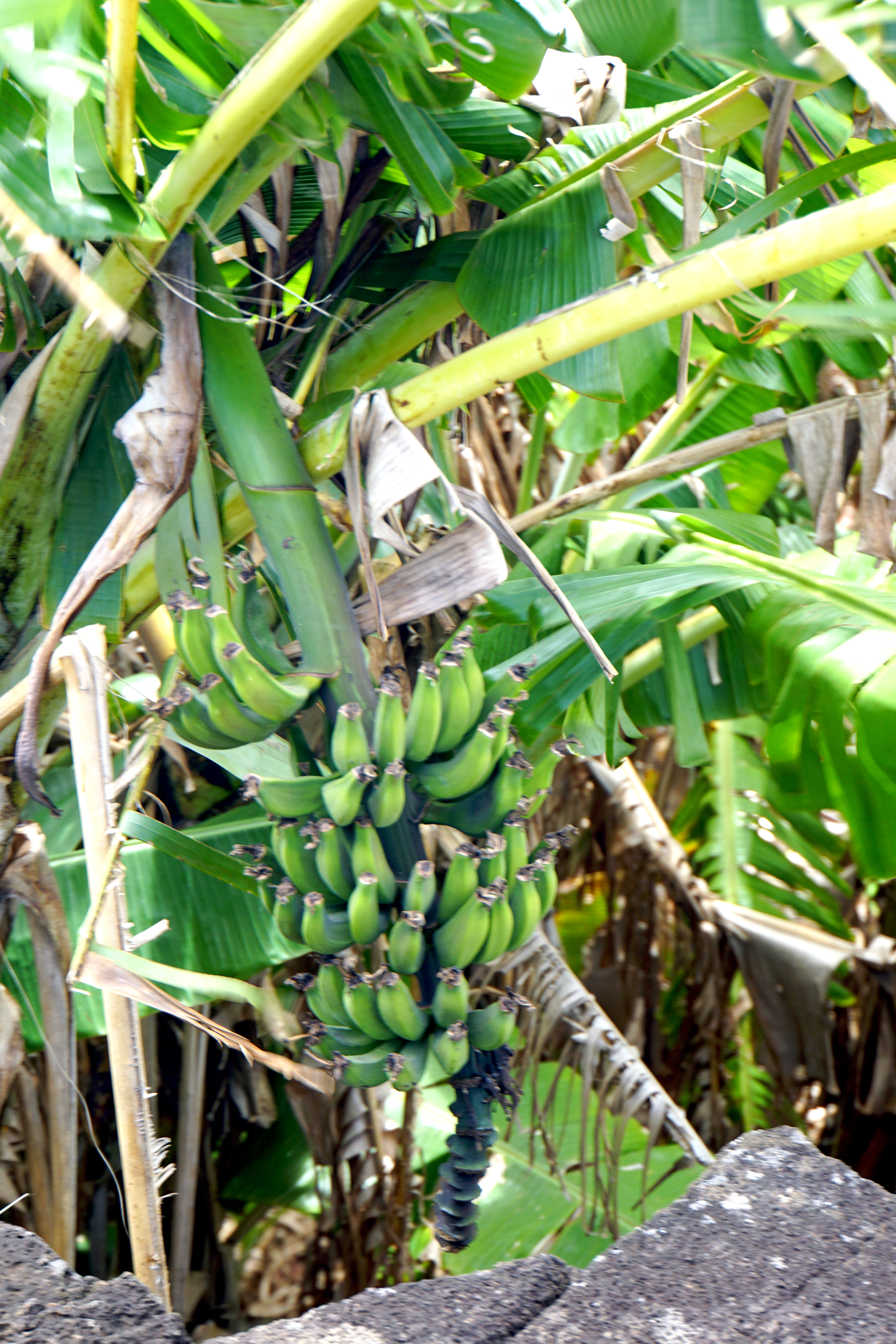
Bananas growing in the caves of Ana Te Pahu

== Dishes ==
- Cazuela: A casserole dish adopted from Chile. The Easter Island version contains Polynesian ingredients such as sweet potato and plantain.
- Ceviche: A raw fish dish cooked in citrus juice. Tuna is the preferred fish.
- Empanada: Baked turnover pastry containing fillings. In Easter Island, tuna is the most popular filling.
- Po'e: A traditional pudding made from pounded foods like banana or taro, wrapped in leaves and baked into a thick consistency.
- Sopaipilla: Leavened bread, rolled into a sheet, cut and deep-fried.
- Tunu Ahi: Fish grilled on hot rock.
- Umu: Also known as Umu pae. It is a traditional method of cooking large quantities of food. Leaves and food are layered on hot rocks before covering with soil.
