= Puleleti =

Polynesian coconut ball

- Type: Confectionery
- Course: Sweet
- Place of origin: Polynesia
- Region or state: Tuvalu, Tokelau
- Main ingredients: Desiccated coconut, coconut syrup

Puleleti is a traditional confection found in the low-lying Polynesian atoll islands of Tuvalu and Tokelau, made from desiccated coconut mixed with coconut syrup and rolled into balls.

To prepare Puleleti, several mature coconuts are gathered and the nut is cut open and the flesh scraped with a grater. The shavings are layered out in the sun and was left to dry for several hours. After drying, the flesh is pounded, with coconut syrup being added to the mixture until oil leaks out. The paste is formed into balls, being squeezed to extract any oil from them and the balls are left to dry. Preparing puleleti is a laborious task, and so they are something that is only made on occasion. The confection has good preservative properties, and is wrapped in pandanus leaves and stored in baskets hanging from roof beams, keeping for up to a year.

Puleleti can also be made from caramelized sugar as a substitute, especially when coconut syrup is unavailable.

== See also ==
- Beijinho
- Chokladboll
