= Laplap =

Vanuatu National Dish

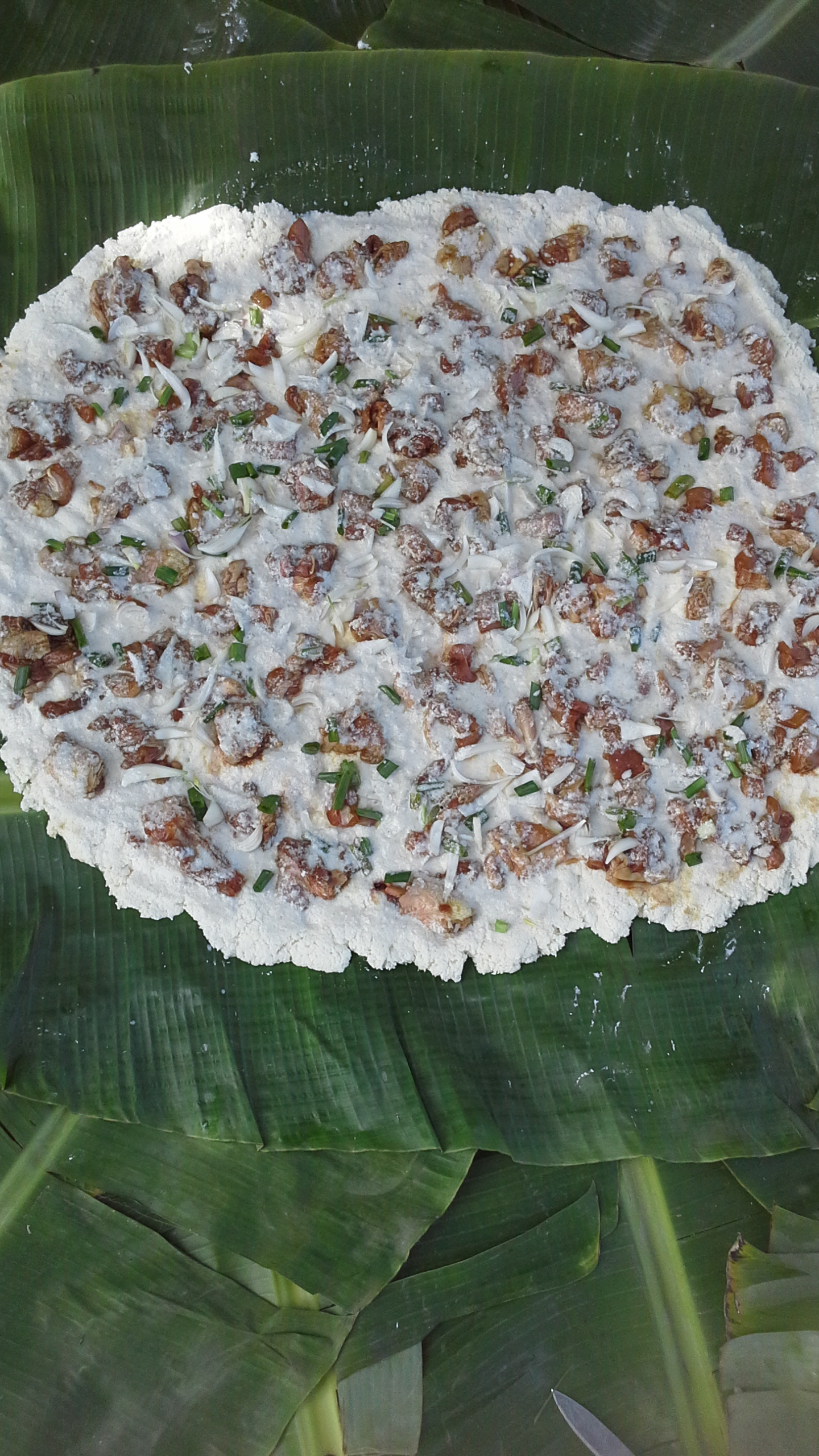
- Laplap
- Place of origin: Vanuatu
- Main ingredients: breadfruit, taro, yam, manioc or banana
- Ingredients generally used: coconut cream, various meats

Laplap (sometimes incorrectly spelled lap lap) is the national dish of Vanuatu. Laplap is prepared by grating taro, yam or manioc roots, or alternatively breadfruit or bananas, into a vegetable paste that is then cooked. The paste is wrapped in banana leaves and cooked in an underground stone oven, with fresh coconut cream. Meats like pork, beef, chicken or flying fox can be added.

The word laplap comes from Bislama, the national language of Vanuatu. It finds its origin in some of the Oceanic languages of the country: e.g. Dorig lablab [laᵐblaᵐb], Nume labalam [laᵐbalam], both reflecting a Proto-Torres-Banks form *laᵐbalaᵐba.

The majority of indigenous languages of Vanuatu, however, name the dish using other roots. For example, Mota loko [loko] and Raga loḡo [loᵑɡo] reflect a Proto-North-Central Vanuatu etymon *loᵑgo; Hiw tegōv [təɣoβ], Lemerig ’ëgëv [ʔœɣœβ] and Mwotlap na-tgop [natɣɔp] reflect Proto-Torres-Banks *taɣoβe; Araki has ureeje [uɾeet͡ʃe], Tamambo has wewe, etc.

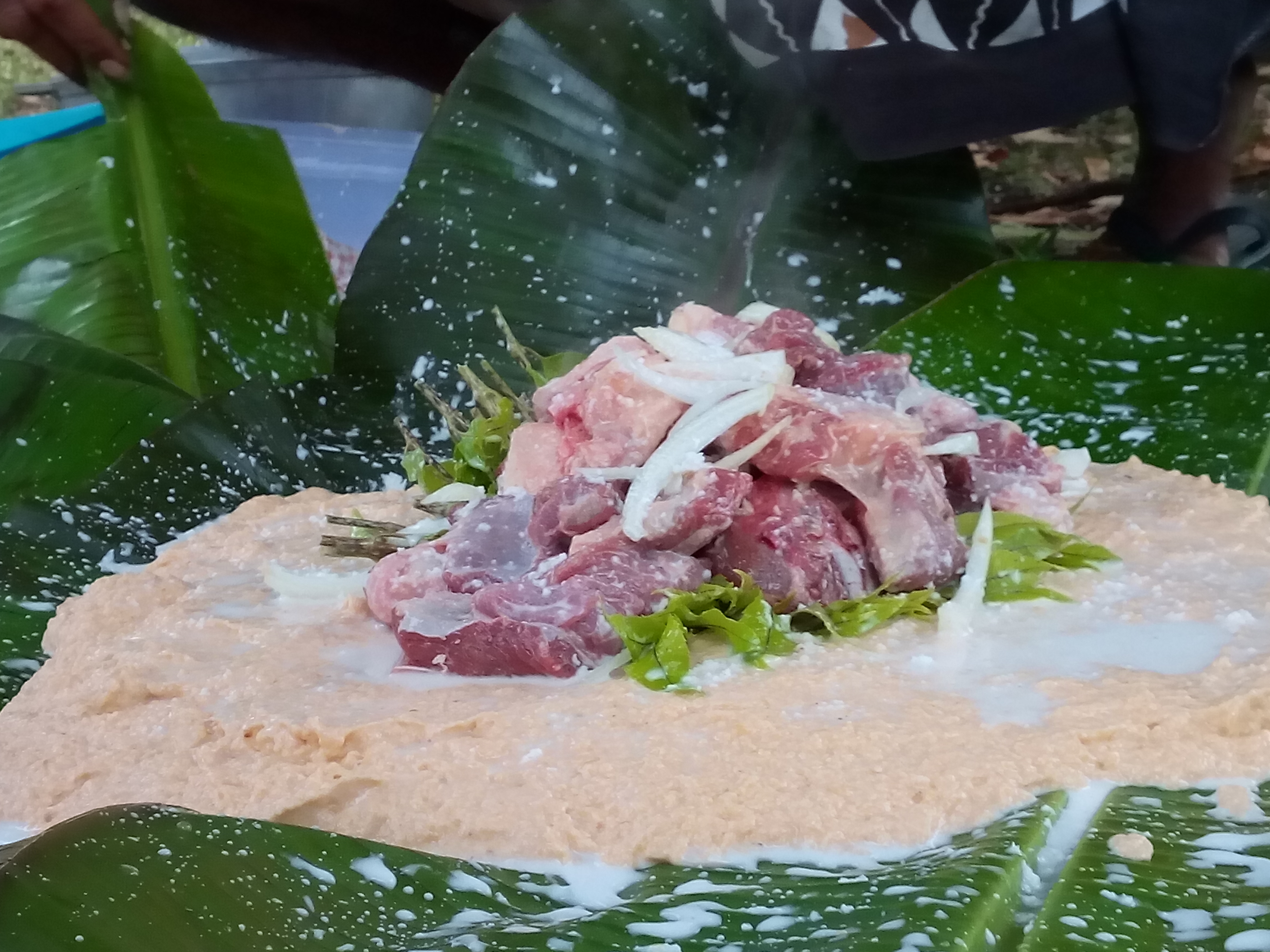
Laplap sosor, a variant of the national dish from Malakula island, before cooking
