= 2023–24 Danish Superliga =

34th season of Danish Superliga

Superliga
- Season: 2023–24
- Dates: 21 July 2023 – 26 May 2024
- Champions: Midtjylland
- Relegated: OB; Hvidovre
- Champions League: Midtjylland
- Europa League: Silkeborg
- Conference League: Brøndby; Copenhagen
- Matches: 193
- Goals: 544 (2.82 per match)
- Top goalscorer: German Onugkha (15)
- Biggest home win: Silkeborg 5–0 Lyngby (6 October 2023); Nordsjælland 7–2 Aarhus (24 April 2024)
- Biggest away win: Randers 0–5 Nordsjælland (13 August 2023)
- Highest scoring: Nordsjælland 7–2 Aarhus (24 April 2024)
- Longest winning run: Midtjylland (6)
- Longest unbeaten run: Brøndby (18)
- Longest winless run: Silkeborg (14)
- Longest losing run: Silkeborg (7)
- Highest attendance: 34,917; Copenhagen 1–2 Midtjylland (16 May 2024)
- Lowest attendance: 1,530; Hvidovre 1–3 Randers (18 February 2024)
- Total attendance: 1,963,472
- Average attendance: 10,173

The 2023–24 Danish Superliga (officially the 3F Superliga for sponsorship purposes) was the 34th season of the Danish Superliga.

It began on 21 July 2023.

== Teams ==
Vejle Boldklub won the 2022–23 Danish 1st Division and made an immediate return to top flight, while Hvidovre IF secured 2nd place and will play in the first tier division for the first time since 1997. The two teams replaced AC Horsens and AaB, making it the first time since 1986 that AaB would not play in the top tier division.

=== Stadiums and locations ===
Locations of the Danish Superliga 2023–24 teams (outside Greater Copenhagen)

| Club | Location | Stadium | Turf | Capacity | 2022–23 position |
|---|---|---|---|---|---|
| AGF | Aarhus | Ceres Park | Hybrid | 20,032 | 3rd |
| Brøndby | Brøndby | Brøndby Stadium | Hybrid | 29,000 | 5th |
| Copenhagen | Copenhagen | Parken | Hybrid | 38,065 | 1st |
| Hvidovre IF | Hvidovre | Hvidovre Stadion | Natural | 12,000 | 1D, 2nd |
| Lyngby | Kongens Lyngby | Lyngby Stadium | Natural | 8,000 | 10th |
| Midtjylland | Herning | MCH Arena | Natural | 11,800 | 7th |
| Nordsjælland | Farum | Right to Dream Park | Artificial | 9,900 | 2nd |
| OB | Odense | Nature Energy Park | Natural | 15,633 | 8th |
| Randers | Randers | Cepheus Park Randers | Natural | 12,000 | 6th |
| Silkeborg | Silkeborg | JYSK Park | Artificial | 10,000 | 9th |
| Vejle | Vejle | Vejle Stadion | Natural | 10,418 | 1D, 1st |
| Viborg | Viborg | Energi Viborg Arena | Hybrid | 9,566 | 4th |

=== Personnel and sponsoring ===
Note: Flags indicate national team as has been defined under FIFA eligibility rules. Players and Managers may hold more than one non-FIFA nationality.

| Team | Head coach | Captain | Kit manufacturer | Shirt sponsor (front) | Shirt sponsor (back) | Shirt sponsor (sleeve) | Shorts sponsor |
|---|---|---|---|---|---|---|---|
| AGF | (Germany) Uwe Rösler | (Denmark) Patrick Mortensen | Hummel | Ceres (H)/Bravida (A & T), Arbejdernes Landsbank (H) | Arbejdernes Landsbank (A & T) | ed A/S | Bravida (H)/Faxe Kondi (A & T) |
| Brøndby | (Denmark) Jesper Sørensen | (Denmark) Kevin Mensah | Hummel | None | NTG Nordic Transport | Boozt | None |
| Copenhagen | (Denmark) Jacob Neestrup | (Sweden) Viktor Claesson | Adidas | Unibet | None | Carlsberg | Unibet |
| Hvidovre | (Denmark) Per Frandsen | (Denmark) Daniel Stenderup | Uhlsport | KBS Byg A/S, Pro Ventilation | Cerama High Temperature Products | Cupra | NTG Nordic Transport |
| Lyngby | (Denmark) David Nielsen | (Denmark) Kasper Enghardt | Adidas | Spreadex Sports, Carl Ras | Airtox | V8 Construction | Johannes Fog |
| Midtjylland | (Denmark) Thomas Thomasberg | (Denmark) Henrik Dalsgaard | Puma | Vestjysk Bank (H)/Arbejdernes Landsbank (A & T), Jack & Jones | Ejner Hessel | AL Finans | AL Finans |
| Nordsjælland | (Denmark) Johannes Hoff Thorup | (Denmark) Kian Hansen | Nike | DHL | Arbejdernes Landsbank | Arbejdernes Landsbank | Faxe Kondi |
| OB | (Denmark) Søren Krogh | (Denmark) Bashkim Kadrii | Hummel | Albani | Albani | BMW Bayern AutoGroup | Faxe Kondi |
| Randers | (Denmark) Rasmus Bertelsen | (Germany) Björn Kopplin | Puma | Verdo, Sparekassen Kronjylland | Jysk Vin (H)/Gardin Lis (A) | ACTEC Batterier | Klodskassen |
| Silkeborg | (Denmark) Kent Nielsen | (Denmark) Nicolai Larsen | Uhlsport | JYSK, Lars Larsen Group | Various | SPORT 24 A/S | GMB Ejendomme |
| Vejle | (Croatia) Ivan Prelec | (Spain) Raúl Albentosa | Adidas | Arbejdernes Landsbank/Vestjysk Bank/AL Finans | 5E Byg (H)/StockGroup A/S (A) | SPORT 24 A/S | Various |
| Viborg | (Denmark) Jakob Poulsen | (Denmark) Jeppe Grønning | Capelli Sport | Peter Larsen Kaffe, SkilteCentret | Kærsgaard A/S | Exolak | Vexa Ejendomskreditselskab |

=== Managerial changes ===
| Team | Outgoing manager | Manner of departure | Date of vacancy | Replaced by | Date of appointment | Position in table |
|---|---|---|---|---|---|---|
| OB | (Sweden) Andreas Alm | Sacked | 2 November 2023 | (Denmark) Søren Krogh | 2 November 2023 | 10th |
| Viborg FF | (Denmark) Jacob Friis | Signed by FC Augsburg | 8 November 2023 | (Denmark) Jakob Poulsen | 8 November 2023 | 8th |
| Lyngby Boldklub | (Iceland) Freyr Alexandersson | Signed by K.V. Kortrijk | 5 January 2024 | (Norway) Magne Hoseth | 11 January 2024 | 7th |
| Lyngby Boldklub | (Norway) Magne Hoseth | Sacked | 1 March 2024 | (Denmark) David Nielsen | 5 March 2024 | 9th |

== Regular season ==
=== League table ===
| Pos | Team | Pld | W | D | L | GF | GA | GD | Pts | Qualification |
|---|---|---|---|---|---|---|---|---|---|---|
| 1 | Midtjylland | 22 | 15 | 3 | 4 | 43 | 23 | +20 | 48 | Qualification for the Championship round |
| 2 | Brøndby | 22 | 14 | 5 | 3 | 44 | 20 | +24 | 47 | Qualification for the Championship round |
| 3 | Copenhagen | 22 | 14 | 3 | 5 | 45 | 23 | +22 | 45 | Qualification for the Championship round |
| 4 | Nordsjælland | 22 | 10 | 7 | 5 | 35 | 21 | +14 | 37 | Qualification for the Championship round |
| 5 | AGF | 22 | 9 | 9 | 4 | 26 | 21 | +5 | 36 | Qualification for the Championship round |
| 6 | Silkeborg | 22 | 8 | 3 | 11 | 28 | 32 | −4 | 27 | Qualification for the Championship round |
| 7 | OB | 22 | 6 | 6 | 10 | 25 | 32 | −7 | 24 | Qualification for the Relegation round |
| 8 | Lyngby | 22 | 6 | 5 | 11 | 27 | 39 | −12 | 23 | Qualification for the Relegation round |
| 9 | Viborg | 22 | 6 | 5 | 11 | 24 | 37 | −13 | 23 | Qualification for the Relegation round |
| 10 | Randers | 22 | 5 | 8 | 9 | 23 | 37 | −14 | 23 | Qualification for the Relegation round |
| 11 | Vejle | 22 | 4 | 7 | 11 | 19 | 26 | −7 | 19 | Qualification for the Relegation round |
| 12 | Hvidovre | 22 | 2 | 5 | 15 | 17 | 45 | −28 | 11 | Qualification for the Relegation round |

Source: Danish Football Association (in Danish), Soccerway
Rules for classification: 1) Points; 2) Goal difference; 3) Goals scored; 4) Away goals scored; 5) Play-off (played on neutral ground if determining teams for different rounds); 6) Draw.

=== Results ===
| Home \ Away | AGF | BRO | COP | HVI | LYN | MID | NOR | ODE | RAN | SIL | VEJ | VIB |
|---|---|---|---|---|---|---|---|---|---|---|---|---|
| AGF | | 0–3 | 1–1 | 1–0 | 1–0 | 2–3 | 1–3 | 1–1 | 2–1 | 2–2 | 1–0 | 2–0 |
| Brøndby | 1–1 | | 2–3 | 4–0 | 3–0 | 1–0 | 2–1 | 1–2 | 3–1 | 4–1 | 1–1 | 1–0 |
| Copenhagen | 1–2 | 0–0 | | 4–0 | 4–0 | 0–2 | 2–0 | 2–1 | 4–0 | 1–3 | 2–1 | 2–0 |
| Hvidovre | 0–2 | 0–3 | 0–2 | | 0–1 | 1–4 | 1–2 | 1–5 | 1–3 | 1–2 | 1–1 | 2–2 |
| Lyngby | 0–2 | 3–3 | 1–2 | 2–4 | | 4–1 | 1–1 | 2–2 | 1–0 | 2–0 | 1–1 | 2–0 |
| Midtjylland | 1–1 | 0–1 | 2–0 | 1–0 | 2–1 | | 2–0 | 2–1 | 2–2 | 2–0 | 3–0 | 5–1 |
| Nordsjælland | 0–0 | 3–1 | 2–2 | 0–0 | 3–2 | 3–0 | | 0–1 | 1–1 | 3–1 | 1–0 | 4–1 |
| OB | 1–1 | 0–3 | 0–2 | 0–2 | 1–2 | 1–2 | 1–1 | | 2–2 | 0–3 | 1–2 | 1–2 |
| Randers | 1–1 | 2–2 | 2–4 | 2–2 | 1–0 | 0–1 | 0–5 | 0–1 | | 1–0 | 0–0 | 1–0 |
| Silkeborg | 0–1 | 1–2 | 0–3 | 1–0 | 5–0 | 1–4 | 2–0 | 0–0 | 1–1 | | 2–1 | 2–0 |
| Vejle | 0–0 | 0–1 | 2–3 | 3–1 | 1–0 | 1–2 | 0–0 | 0–1 | 1–2 | 2–0 | | 1–1 |
| Viborg | 2–1 | 1–2 | 2–1 | 0–0 | 2–2 | 2–2 | 0–2 | 1–2 | 3–0 | 2–1 | 2–1 | |

Source: svenskfotboll.se
Legend: Blue = home team win; Yellow = draw; Red = away team win.

== Championship round ==
Points and goals carried over in full from the regular season.

| Pos | Team | Pld | W | D | L | GF | GA | GD | Pts | |
|---|---|---|---|---|---|---|---|---|---|---|
| 1 | Midtjylland (C) | 32 | 19 | 6 | 7 | 62 | 43 | +19 | 63 | Qualification for the Champions League second qualifying round |
| 2 | Brøndby | 32 | 18 | 8 | 6 | 60 | 35 | +25 | 62 | Qualification for the Conference League second qualifying round |
| 3 | Copenhagen (O) | 32 | 18 | 5 | 9 | 64 | 38 | +26 | 59 | Qualification for the European play-off match |
| 4 | Nordsjælland | 32 | 16 | 10 | 6 | 60 | 34 | +26 | 58 | |
| 5 | AGF | 32 | 11 | 11 | 10 | 42 | 46 | −4 | 44 | |
| 6 | Silkeborg | 32 | 10 | 6 | 16 | 39 | 50 | −11 | 36 | Qualification for the Europa League second qualifying round (Note: The 2023–24 Danish Cup winners (Silkeborg) qualify for the Europa League second qualifying round.) |

Source: Danish Football Association (in Danish), Soccerway
Rules for classification: 1) Points; 2) Goal difference; 3) Goals scored; 4) Away goals scored; 5) Play-off (played on neutral ground if determining teams for different rounds); 6) Draw.
(C) Champions; (O) Play-off winners

=== Results ===
| Home \ Away | AGF | BRO | COP | MID | NOR | SIL |
|---|---|---|---|---|---|---|
| AGF | | 2–2 | 3–2 | 0–1 | 1–3 | 0–1 |
| Brøndby | 2–3 | | 1–3 | 2–1 | 1–0 | 1–1 |
| Copenhagen | 3–2 | 1–2 | | 1–2 | 1–1 | 2–0 |
| Midtjylland | 2–1 | 3–2 | 2–2 | | 2–3 | 3–3 |
| Nordsjælland | 7–2 | 1–1 | 2–1 | 3–3 | | 4–1 |
| Silkeborg | 2–2 | 0–2 | 0–3 | 3–0 | 0–1 | |

Legend: Blue = home team win; Yellow = draw; Red = away team win.

== Relegation round ==
Points and goals carried over in full from the regular season.

| Pos | Team | Pld | W | D | L | GF | GA | GD | Pts | |
|---|---|---|---|---|---|---|---|---|---|---|
| 1 | Randers | 32 | 10 | 11 | 11 | 41 | 49 | −8 | 41 | Qualification for the European play-off match |
| 2 | Viborg | 32 | 11 | 7 | 14 | 38 | 48 | −10 | 40 | |
| 3 | Vejle | 32 | 9 | 9 | 14 | 32 | 36 | −4 | 36 | |
| 4 | Lyngby | 32 | 9 | 9 | 14 | 39 | 53 | −14 | 36 | |
| 5 | OB (R) | 32 | 8 | 8 | 16 | 37 | 48 | −11 | 32 | Relegation to 1st Division |
| 6 | Hvidovre (R) | 32 | 4 | 8 | 20 | 27 | 61 | −34 | 20 | Relegation to 1st Division |

Source: Danish Football Association (in Danish), Soccerway
Rules for classification: 1) Points; 2) Goal difference; 3) Goals scored; 4) Away goals scored; 5) Play-off (played on neutral ground if determining teams for different rounds); 6) Draw.
(R) Relegated

=== Results ===
| Home \ Away | HVI | LYN | ODE | RAN | VEJ | VIB |
|---|---|---|---|---|---|---|
| Hvidovre | | 0–0 | 1–2 | 1–3 | 2–1 | 0–1 |
| Lyngby | 1–1 | | 0–0 | 2–1 | 1–1 | 3–1 |
| OB | 1–2 | 1–2 | | 2–0 | 0–1 | 1–3 |
| Randers | 2–2 | 6–2 | 2–2 | | 1–0 | 1–0 |
| Vejle | 2–0 | 1–0 | 3–2 | 1–2 | | 1–1 |
| Viborg | 3–1 | 2–1 | 2–1 | 0–0 | 1–2 | |

Source: svenskfotboll.se
Legend: Blue = home team win; Yellow = draw; Red = away team win.

== European play-offs ==
The 3rd-placed team of the championship round advances to a play-off match against the winning team of the qualification round (no. 7) in a single-leg tie, with the team from the championship round as hosts. The winner earns a place in the Conference League second qualifying round.

=== European play-off match ===
31 May 2024
19:00

| Copenhagen | 2–1 | Randers |
|---|---|---|
| Óskarsson 13'; Elyounoussi 57' | Report | Dammers 5' |

Parken, Copenhagen
Attendance: 24,866
Referee: Jakob Kehlet

== Season statistics ==
=== Top scorers ===
As of 21 May 2024

| Rank | Player | Club | Goals |
|---|---|---|---|
| 1 | (Russia) German Onugkha | Vejle | 15 |
| 2 | (Denmark) Nicolai Vallys | Brøndby | 13 |
| 2 | (Iceland) Andri Guðjohnsen | Lyngby | 13 |
| 4 | (Denmark) Patrick Mortensen | AGF | 12 |
| 4 | (South Korea) Cho Gue-sung | Midtjylland | 12 |
| 6 | (Denmark) Alexander Lind | Silkeborg | 10 |
| 6 | (Norway) Ohi Omoijuanfo | Brøndby | 10 |
| 6 | (Guinea-Bissau) Franculino | Midtjylland | 10 |
| 9 | (Denmark) Marcus Ingvartsen | Nordsjælland | 9 |
| 9 | (Norway) Andreas Schjelderup | Nordsjælland | 9 |
| 9 | (Norway) Mohamed Elyounoussi | Copenhagen | 9 |
| 9 | (Iceland) Orri Óskarsson | Copenhagen | 9 |
| 9 | (Japan) Yuito Suzuki | Brøndby | 9 |
| 9 | (Ghana) Mohammed Fuseini | Randers | 9 |
| 9 | (Iceland) Stefán Thórdarson | Silkeborg | 9 |

=== Hat-tricks ===
| Player | For | Against | Result | Date |
|---|---|---|---|---|
| Ernest Nuamah | Nordsjælland | Viborg | 4–1 | 24 July 2023 |
| Stefán Thordarson | Silkeborg | Lyngby | 5–0 | 6 October 2023 |
| Yuito Suzuki | Brøndby | Silkeborg | 4–1 | 17 March 2024 |
| Mohammed Fuseini | Randers | Lyngby | 6-2 | 31 March 2024 |
| Andreas Schjelderup | Nordsjælland | AGF | 7–2 | 22 April 2024 |
| Orri Óskarsson | Copenhagen | AGF | 3-2 | 28 April 2024 |
| Mads Emil Madsen | AGF | Copenhagen | 3-2 | 21 May 2024 |

=== Discipline ===
==== Player ====
- Most yellow cards: 2
  - Nine players
- Most red cards: 1
  - Tobias Lauritsen (Vejle)
  - Stefan Gartenmann (Midtjylland)

==== Club ====
- Most yellow cards: 8
  - Vejle
- Most red cards: 1
  - Vejle
  - Midtjylland

== Attendances ==
FC København drew the highest average home attendance in the 2023-24 edition of the Danish Superliga.

| # | Football club | Home games | Average attendance |
|---|---|---|---|
| 1 | FC København | 11 | 26,928 |
| 2 | Brøndby IF | 11 | 21,502 |
| 3 | Aarhus GF | 11 | 11,865 |
| 4 | Odense BK | 11 | 9,543 |
| 5 | FC Midtjylland | 11 | 9,452 |
| 6 | Vejle BK | 11 | 7,858 |
| 7 | Viborg FF | 11 | 6,401 |
| 8 | Lyngby BK | 11 | 6,231 |
| 9 | Silkeborg IF | 11 | 5,593 |
| 10 | Randers FC | 11 | 5,257 |
| 11 | FC Nordsjælland | 11 | 4,679 |
| 12 | Hvidovre IF | 11 | 3,990 |
