= Maribo Bryghus =

Danish brewery

- Location: Maribo, Denmark
- Opened: 1895
- Owned by: Royal Unibrew

Active beers
Name	Type
Maribo Pilsner	Pilsner
Maribo Classic	Pilsner
Maribo Guld
Maribo Munke Øl
Den Blå
Herkules
Maribo Let Pilsner
Maribo Mørk Hvidtøl
Slots Pilsner
Slots Guld

Seasonal beers
Name	Type
Maribo Julebryg	Christmas Beer
Maribo Påskebryg	Easter Beer

Maribo Bryghus was a Danish brewery located in the town of Maribo. The brewery was founded in 1895 by Christian Jørgensen as Thor Brewery (Thor Bryggeri). It was renamed ten years later to avoid confusion with the Thor Brewery in Randers. In 1997 Maribo Bryghus was acquired by Albani Brewery, which later merged with Bryggerigruppen, now Royal Unibrew.

In 2007 it was decided to close the brewery in the first quarter of 2008. One of the reasons was the increase of the water price in Maribo. Maribo Bryghus was the discount brewery of Royal Unibrew. Production of the most famous Maribo beer brands has been moved to the Faxe Bryggeri in Faxe.

The Egmont Dormitory in Copenhagen is known for its consumption of Maribo Pilsner.
