= Beer in Lithuania =

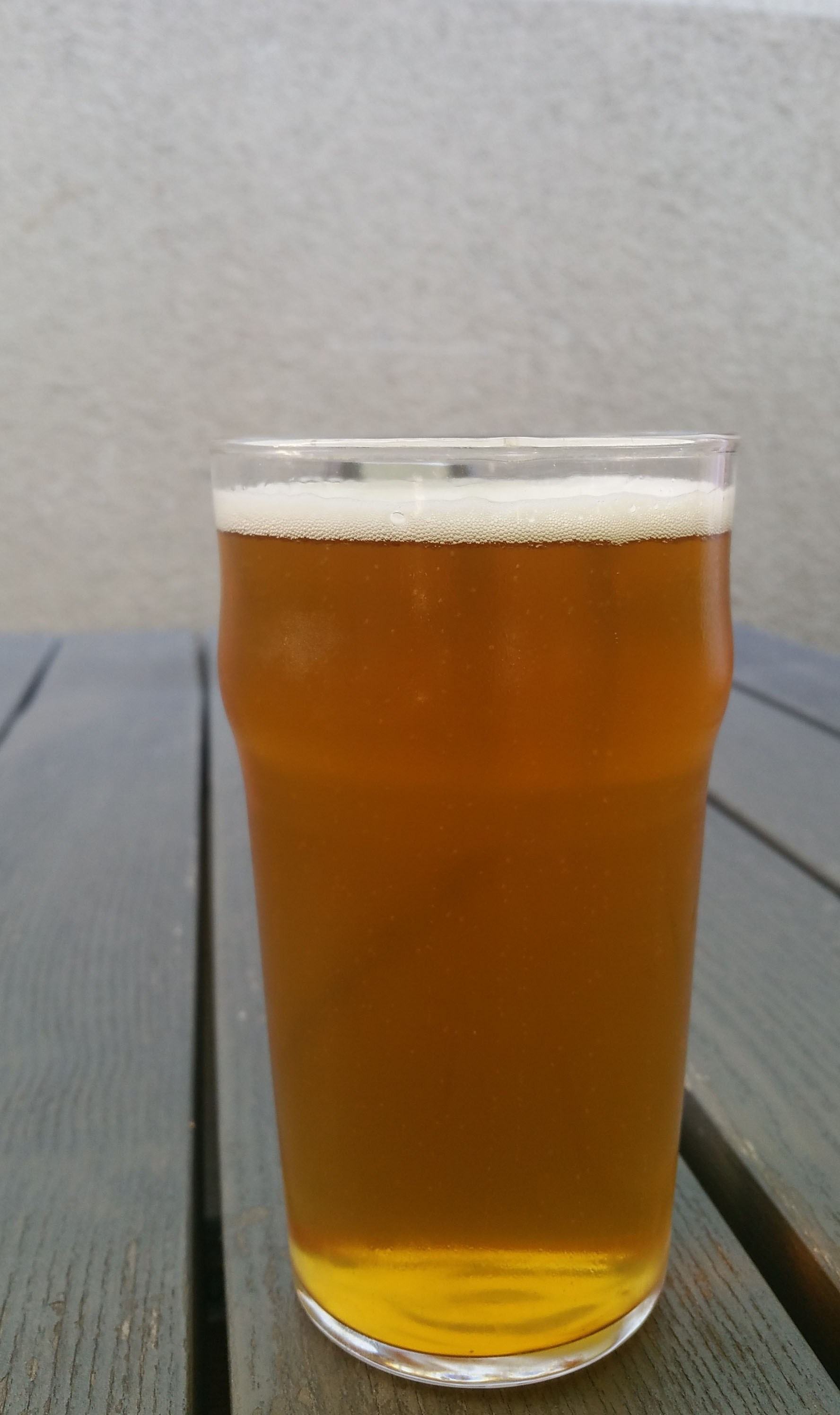
Traditional Lithuanian beer has an earthy and yeasty flavour, rich color of the clay or straw.

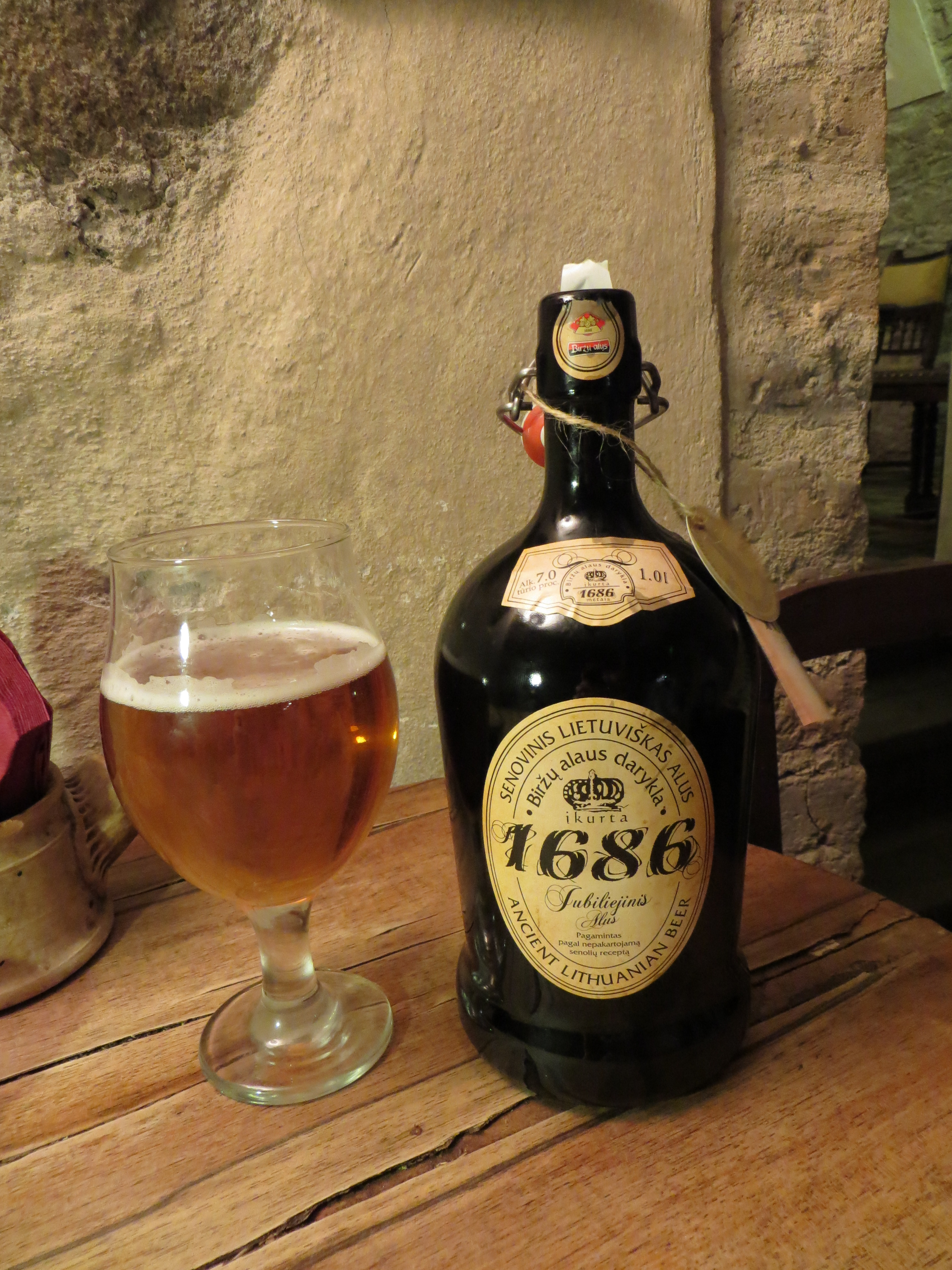
Biržų alus. Biržai region is known for traditional-recipe beer breweries.

The beer brewing tradition in Lithuania tends to favor the northern part of the country and is centered around the towns of Pasvalys, Pakruojis, Kupiškis and Biržai. The farmhouse brews of the region are highly distinctive, using local ingredients and techniques from past generations. Lithuanian farmhouse beer has a soft, sweetish malty palate, with hops that do not dominate the flavor profile.

Beer is the most common alcoholic beverage in Lithuania. Lithuania has a long farmhouse beer tradition, first mentioned in 11th century chronicles. Beer was brewed for ancient Baltic festivities and rituals. The ancient Lithuanian god for brewing beer and mead was Ragutis or Rūgutis. 21st of September was known as the festive Alutinis, Koštuvės or Ragautuvės - the first beer was made using the harvest of the running year. Lithuania is not very well known for its beer worldwide, but it is one of the few countries in Europe to have an independent beer tradition in which breweries do not simply brew beers in styles developed elsewhere. Traditional farmhouse brewing has survived into the present day in Lithuania, and during Soviet times such brewing started to be expanded to a larger scale. After Lithuanian independence was gained, the brewing process gathered speed, and soon there were more than 200 breweries in the country. Many of these have since gone out of business, but Lithuania still has about 80 breweries, of which perhaps 60-70 produce beers in styles unknown in the rest of the world. Some of these are very close to the traditional brews made by farmers, while others have developed out of that tradition as a consequence of the growth of the traditional brewers into reasonably large regional breweries.

Farmhouse brewing survived to a greater extent in Lithuania than anywhere else, and through accidents of history, the Lithuanians then developed a commercial brewing culture from their unique farmhouse traditions. Lithuania was ranked in the top 5 by consumption of beer per capita in Europe in 2015, with 75 active breweries, 32 of which are microbreweries.

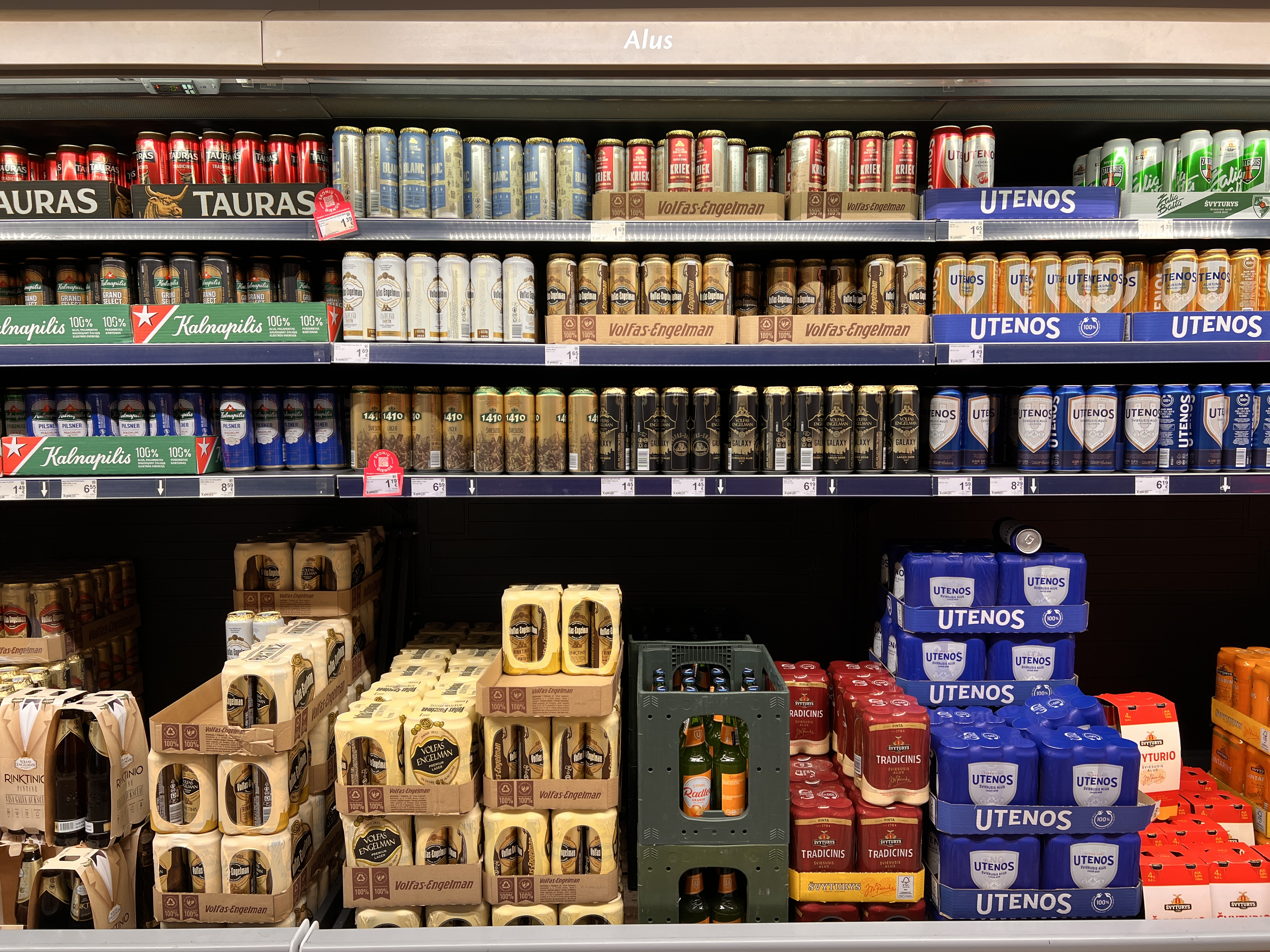
Beer cans in a Maxima supermarket in Vilnius.

The microbrewery scene in Lithuania has been growing in later years, with a number of bars focusing on these beers popping up in Vilnius and also in other parts of the country. Local beers have started to attract international attention after beer bloggers discovered the country, inspiring a major feature article in Beer Connoisseur magazine, prompting the New York Times to list Lithuania as one of the 42 places to visit in 2013 on the strength of the village beers. Beer routes are organized through the main breweries in northern Lithuania.

The biggest commercial breweries are located in towns Utena (Utenos alus), Panevėžys (Kalnapilis), Klaipėda (Švyturys), Kaunas (Volfas Engelman), Vilnius (Tauras) and Šiauliai (Gubernija).

Small and popular breweries are: Dundulis in Panevėžys, Sakiškių alus in Sakiškių village, Genys brewing in Kaunas, Jovarų alus in Pakruojis, Joalda in Joniškėlis and many others.

Two beer festivals take place annually in Lithuania - The Beer Fair “Žmogšala” in March and Vilniaus alaus festivalis (Vilnius Beer Fest - VAF) in November.
