= Tusker (Vanuatu beer) =

Lager beer of Vanuatu

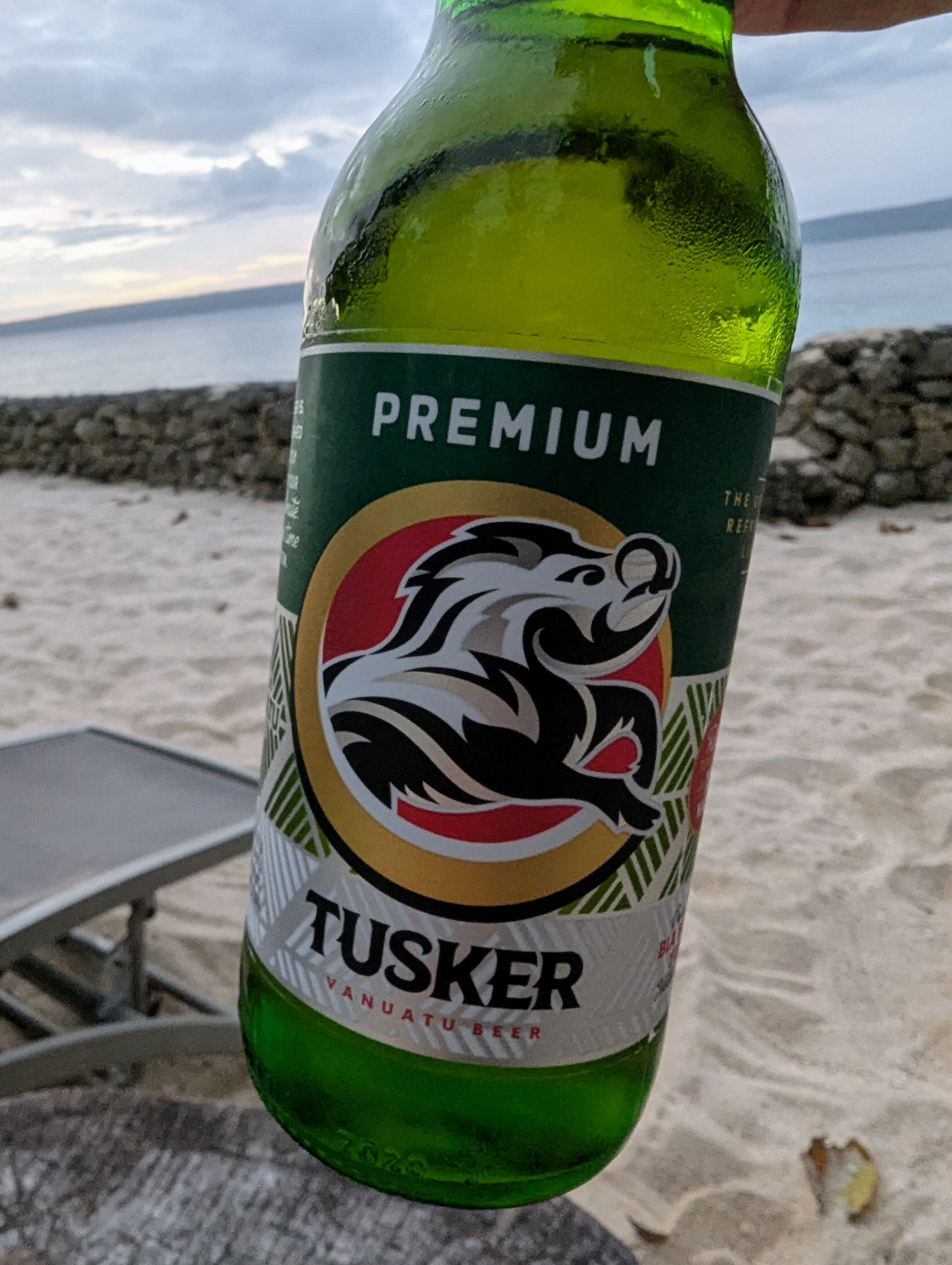
- A bottle of Tusker Premium lager
- Type: Beer
- Manufacturer: Vanuatu Brewing Ltd.
- Country of origin: Port Vila, Vanuatu
- Introduced: 1990
- Alcohol by volume: 5.0%
- Style: Lager
- Website: https://vanuatubrewing.com/

Tusker is a lager produced in Port Vila, Vanuatu, by Vanuatu Brewing Ltd. It is one of the most popular beers in the country and is often considered the national beer of Vanuatu.

== History ==
National Brewery Ltd was established in 1989 as a joint venture by the Vanuatu government and Pripps, a subsidiary of the Swedish Procordia corporation. The brewery's flagship product, Tusker, was released in 1990, and according to the company has a 70% market share. The name "Tusker" is a reference to the large tusks of a pig, a traditional symbol of strength, prosperity and wealth in Vanuatu, which has also been used as a currency.

In 2009, Vanuatu Brewing Ltd was acquired by New Caledonian company Froico Group (Société Le Froid). As of 2016, cans of Tusker were brewed in New Caledonia. Bottled Tusker has been brewed in Port Vila since the founding of the brewery, and a large brewery expansion was taking place in 2024.

== Products ==
The Tusker brand includes several variations:

- Tusker Premium: The original beer, a standard lager with a 5.0% alcohol by volume (ABV).
- Tusker Bitter: An English-style bitter (pale ale) with 5.5% ABV.
- Tusker Lemon: A radler-style beer combining Tusker lager with lemon juice.
- Tusker OP: A stronger beer with 7% ABV.

Tusker beer is sold in 330 ml bottles and cans.

== Marketing and culture ==
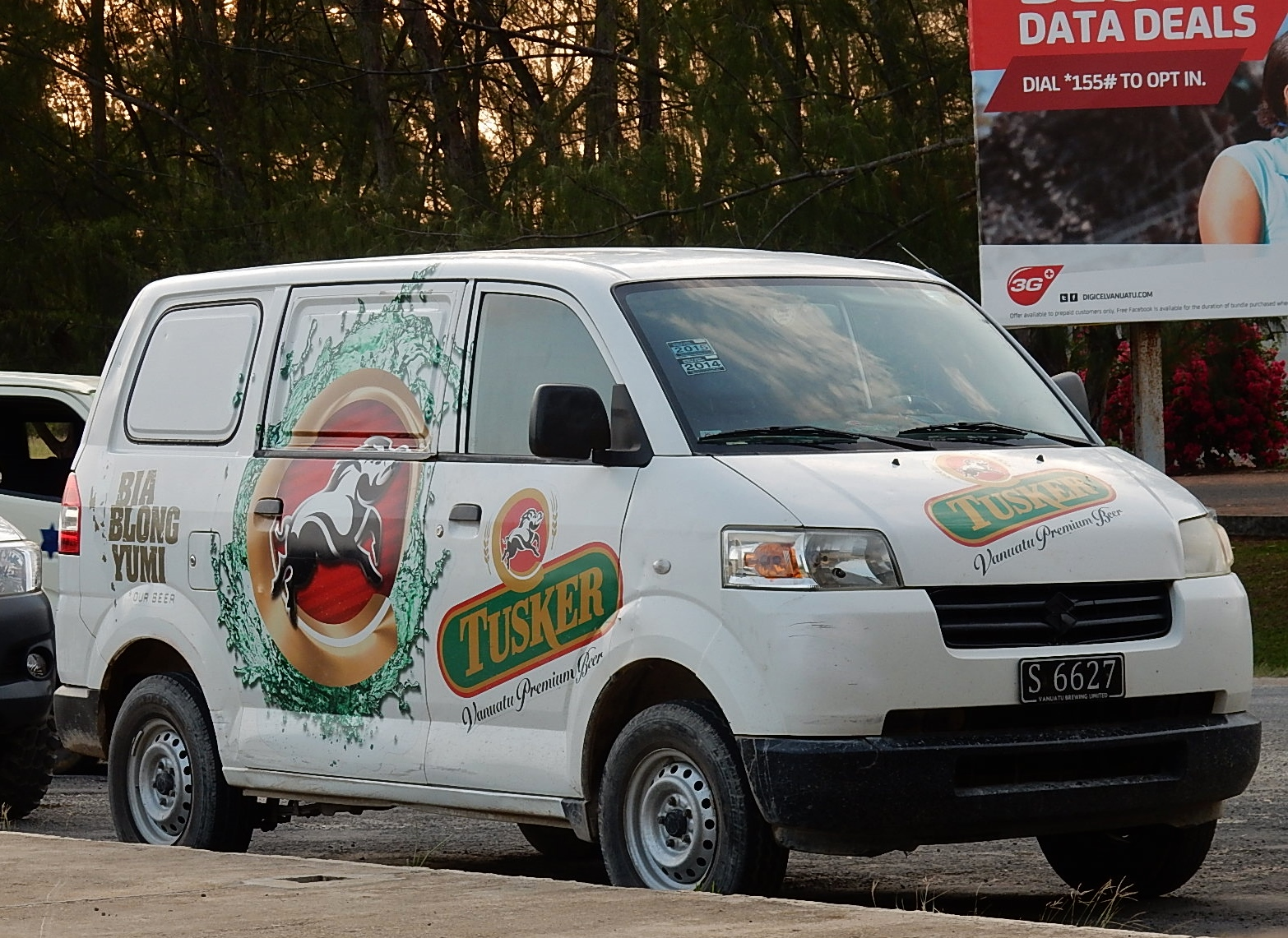
A van marketing Tusker, with the Bislama slogan Bia Blong Yumi ("Our Beer")

Tusker is often considered the national beer of Vanuatu. The brand has been marketed with the phrase Bia Blong Yumi, meaning "Our Beer" in Bislama. It is widely available, and has sponsored local community events and a local sports team.

In 2022, a promotional oversized Tusker beer bottle at a roundabout in central Port Vila was replaced with a bottle of sparkling water after complaints from the Vanuatu Christian Council.
