= Tanker Brewery =

Estonian brewery

- Company type: Subsidiary
- Industry: Beverage
- Founded: 2014
- Headquarters: Jüri, Estonia
- Products: Beers
- Number of employees: 32
- Website: Official website

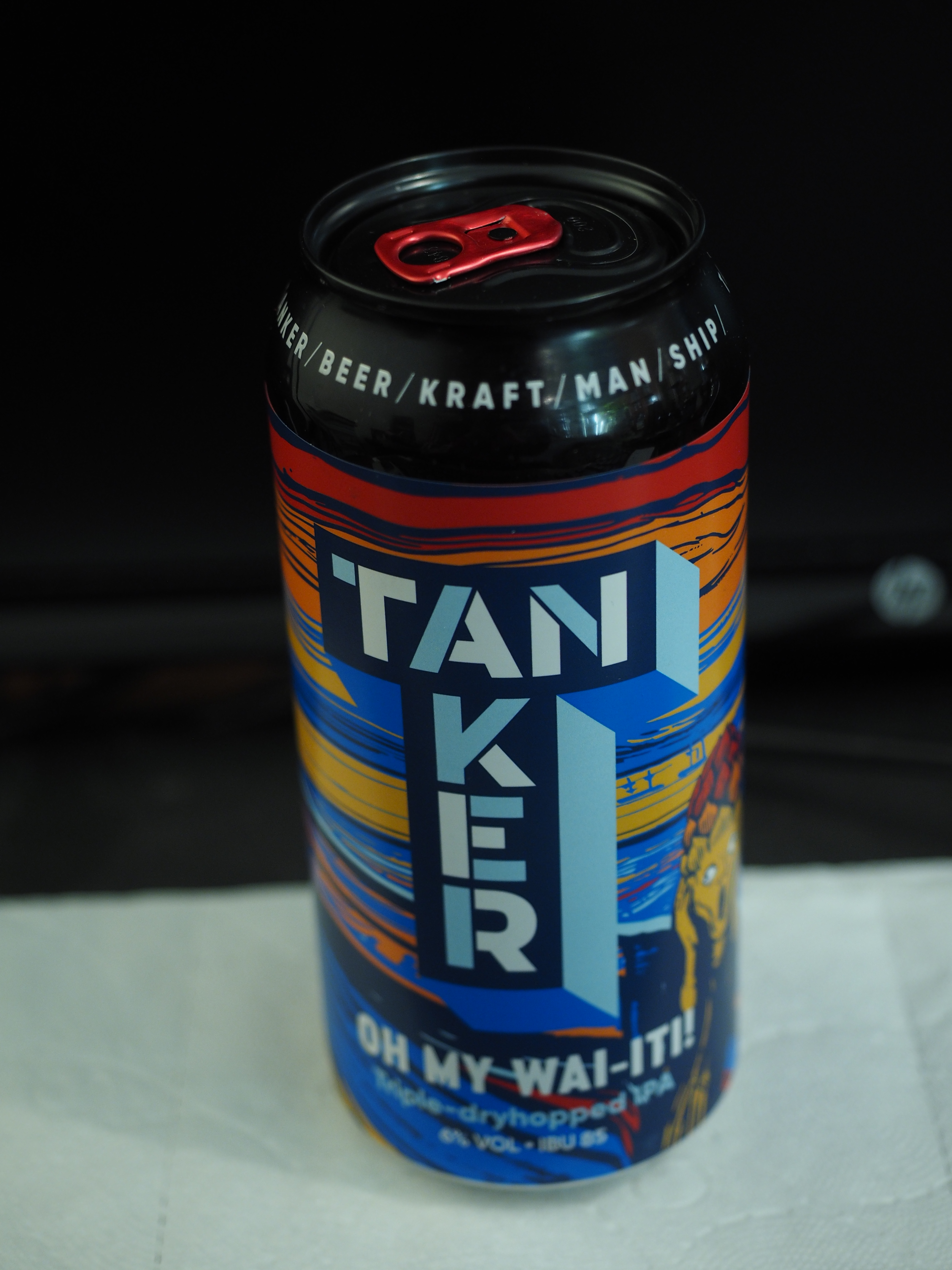
A can of Tanker "Oh My Wai-Iti" IPA.

Tanker Brewery is an Estonian brewery founded in Tallinn in 2014. The brewery's best-selling product is Sauna Session, a beer flavoured with birch whisks.

In 2019, Tanker Brewery opened a new factory in the town of Jüri south of Tallinn, nearly two times bigger than their existing factory. This allowed the brewery to package beer in cans instead of glass bottles.

In 2021, Tanker Brewery was acquired by the Danish company Royal Unibrew, which also owns the Finnish brewery Hartwall. Tanker's CEO, Jaanis Tammela, said the cooperation would be beneficial to both parties and would enable further growth, expansion into new markets and wider product availability.

Tanker is responsible for the distribution in Estonia of various international brands, including Heineken and Pepsi.
