= Lorina =

French carbonated soft drink

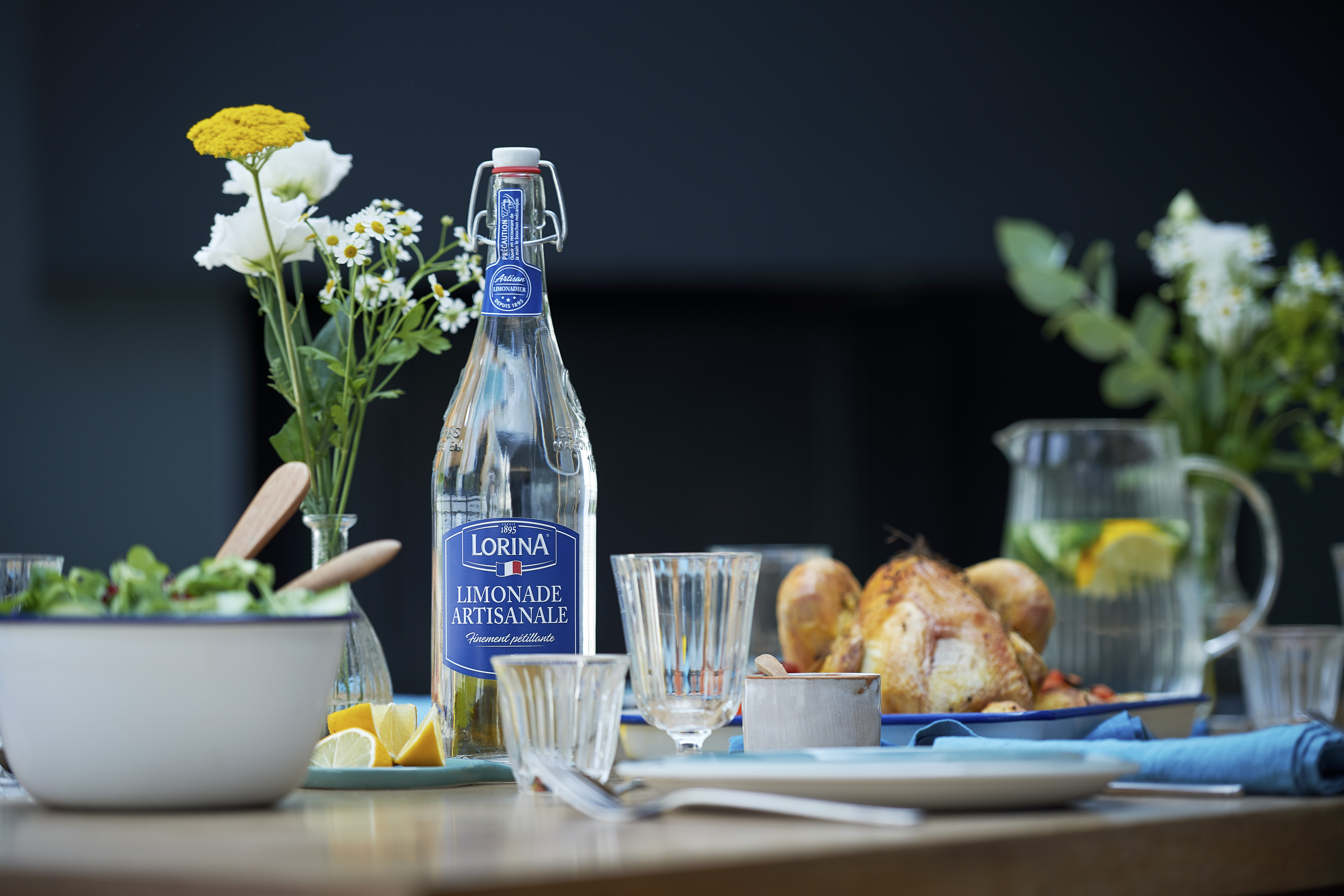
Bottle of Lorina

Lorina is a company that produces soft drinks. It was founded by Victor Geyer in 1895 in Munster, France, and was acquired by Royal Unibrew of Denmark in 2018.
