= Förvaltningsaktiebolaget Stattum =

Förvaltningsaktiebolaget Stattum, a Swedish government holding company that can be characterized as a National Wealth Fund. It was set up in 1991, to manage the listed shareholdings of the Swedish government, following the dismantling of Fortia AB and Statsföretag. Shareholdings included Celsius Industrier AB, AssiDomän, SSAB, and Pharmacia & Upjohn.

Stattum played a leading role when the Swedish government made the first attempt by a European government to address systematically the ownership and management of government enterprises in 1998–2001.
