= Pripps =

Swedish brewery

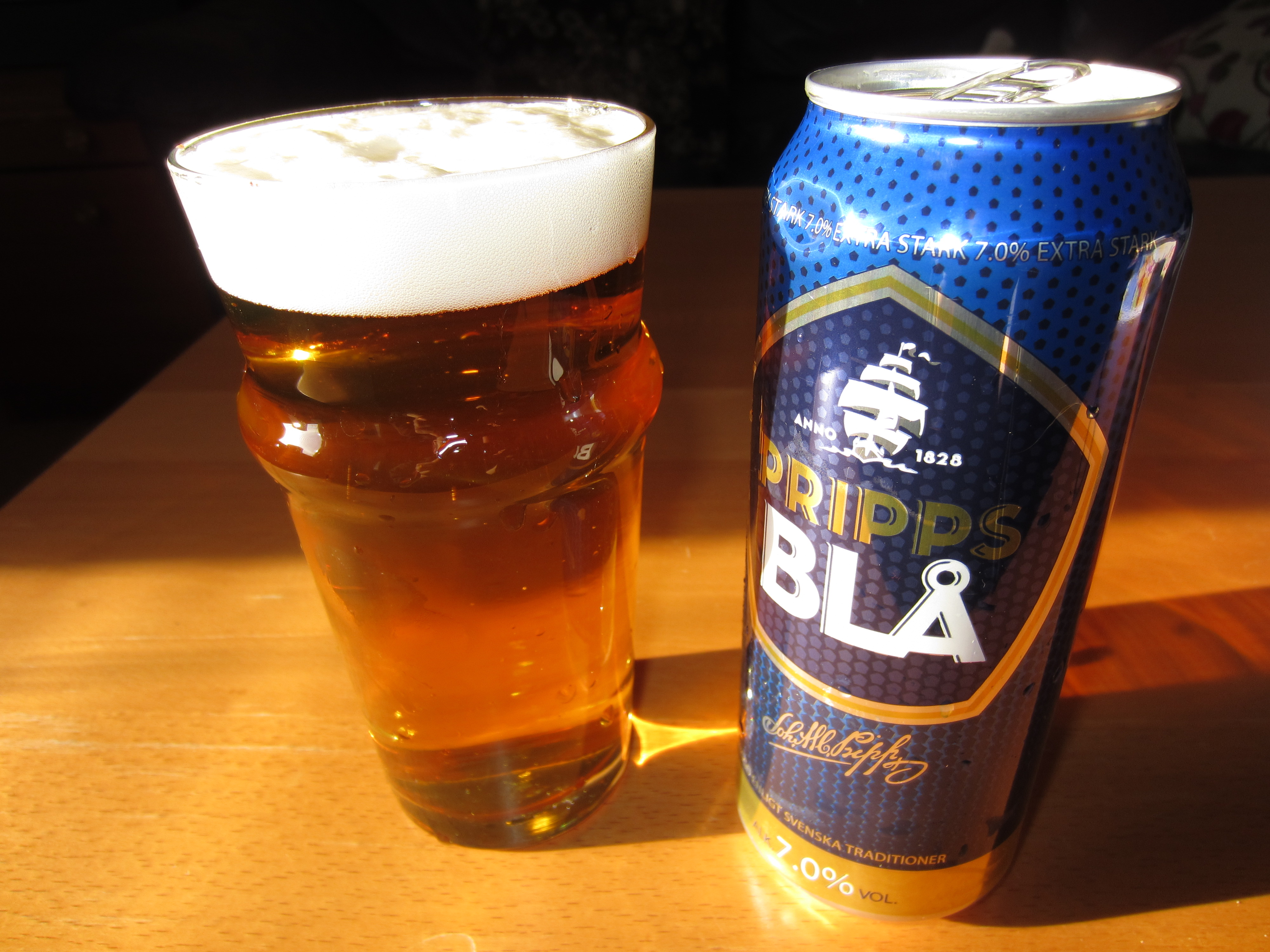
- Pripps Blå 7.0%
- Location: Gothenburg, Sweden
- Opened: 1828
- Owned by: Carlsberg
- Website: www.pripps.se

Active beers
Name	Type
Pripps Blå	lager
Pripps Blå Pure	lager
Pripps Blå Light	lager
Pripps Blå Extra Stark	lager

Seasonal beers
Name	Type
Pripps Blå Sommarspecial	lager
Pripps Julöl	dunkel

Pripps is a former brewery in Sweden that now only lives on as a brand of Carlsberg. The company was based in Stockholm; their main product was Pripps Blå (Pripps blue). They also owned Ramlösa. Pripps was founded in Gothenburg by Johan Albrecht Pripp in 1828.

== History ==
The Swedish government became a majority owner of Pripps in 1974.

Pripps, at the time a subsidiary of the Procordia, founded the National Brewery Ltd as a joint venture with the government of Vanuatu in 1989, releasing their flagship Tusker beer the following year.

== Beer ==
Pripps Blå, lit. Pripp's Blue, is a light lager first introduced in 1959; it is said to be one of the most popular beers in Sweden.

Pripps Blå is an inexpensive beer, for it is brewed with exactly 51% barley — the minimum amount of barley in beer required by Swedish law. A low-calorie version called Pripps Blå Light is also made. Other versions are Pripps Blå Extra Stark, a full malt, extra strong beer with 7.2% alcohol and Pripps Blå Pure with a lower carbohydrates content, scheduled to replace Pripps Blå Light.

== Brewery ==
The beers are brewed at Carlsberg Sverige.

== CEOs of Pripps bryggerier AB ==
- 1972-1981 - Kurt Rydé
- 1981-???? - Nils Holgerson
- 1985-1986 - Bill Fransson
- 1986-1990 - Hans Källenius
- 1990-1992 - Andreas Ericson
