= Tobias Lauritsen (footballer, born 2004) =

Danish footballer (born 2004)

Personal information
- Full name: Tobias Lauritsen
- Date of birth: 18 June 2004 (age 22)
- Place of birth: Randers, Denmark
- Position: Midfielder

Team information
- Current team: Vejle
- Number: 8

Youth career
- Himmelev-Veddelev
- –2019: FC Roskilde
- 2019–2023: Vejle

Senior career*
Years	Team	Apps	(Gls)
2022–	Vejle	60	(4)

International career^{‡}
2023	Denmark U20	4	(0)
- * Club domestic league appearances and goals as of 10 December 2025 ‡ National team caps and goals as of 18:22, 8 February 2024 (UTC)

Tobias Lauritsen (born 18 June 2004) is a Danish professional footballer who plays as a midfielder for Danish Superliga club Vejle Boldklub.

Lauritsen is the son of Morten Lauritsen, who as an active player made 32 Danish Superliga appearances for AaB and Randers FC between 1996 and 2005.

== Early life and career ==
Lauritsen was born in Randers, Denmark, and moved with his family to Trekroner and later Himmelev near Roskilde at the age of six. He began playing youth football with Himmelev-Veddelev Boldklub and later joined FC Roskilde. After attending a sports-focused efterskole in Vejle, he enrolled in a vocational carpentry program, completing two foundation courses and beginning an apprenticeship with a local firm. During this time, he was also playing youth football for Vejle Boldklub, balancing manual work with his athletic commitments. However, the physical demands of combining both paths led him to put the apprenticeship on hold, in order to pursue a full-time professional football career.

== Career ==
=== Vejle ===
Lauritsen joined the youth academy of Vejle Boldklub in 2019. He progressed through the youth ranks and was promoted to the first team squad in the summer of 2020.

He made his official debut on 2 August 2022 in a Danish Cup match against OKS. Later that month, he made his league debut in the Danish 1st Division.

Following Vejle's promotion to the 2023–24 Danish Superliga, Lauritsen became a regular first-team player. In 2024, he extended his contract with the club through the summer of 2027. Ahead of the 2024–25 season, he was assigned jersey number 8.

== Personal life ==
Lauritsen is commonly known by the nickname "Bisse", a childhood name that originated in Randers and evolved during his time at efterskole in Vejle. While his family uses his given name, the nickname is widely used by teammates and the media.

== Honours ==
Vejle

- Danish 1st Division: 2022–23
