= Kalnapilis =

- Location: Panevėžys, Lithuania
- Opened: 1902
- Owned by: Royal Unibrew

Active beers
Name	Type
Black
Dvaro
Original	Helles
Grand	Dortmunder
Pilsner	Pilsener
Red
7.30	Maibock
Kalnapilis in ICE	Ice beer

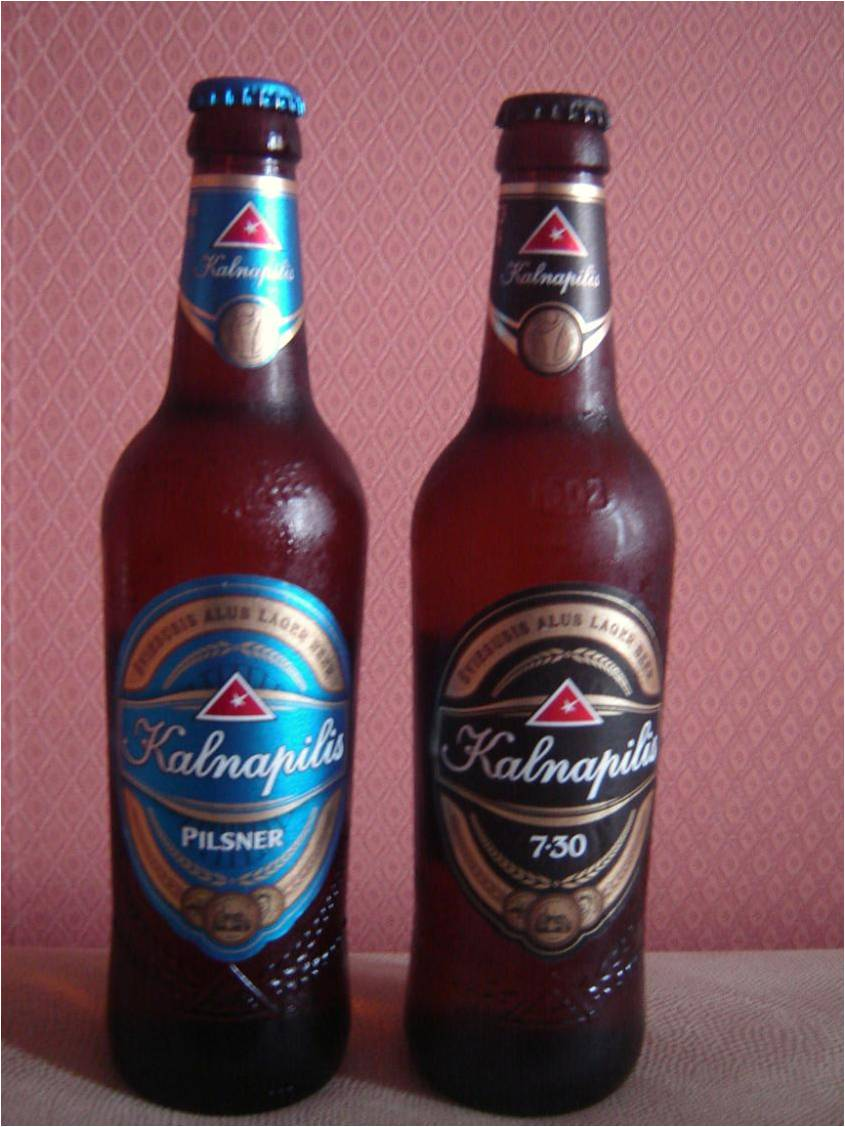
Two bottles of Kalnapilis beer

Kalnapilis is a Lithuanian brewery, established by Albert Foight in Panevėžys in 1902. A landowner of German origin, Foight named the brewery Bergschlösschen, meaning a small castle on the hill. In 1918, the name was changed to a Lithuanian equivalent of Bergschlösschen, Kalnapilis.

Kalnapilis was taken over by Baltic Beverages Holding (established by Pripps of Sweden and Hartwall of Finland) in 1994. Ownership passed to Royal Unibrew in 2001, which merged the Kalnapilis with Tauras brewery in Vilnius into AB Kalnapilio-Tauro Grupė.

In April 1996, new fermentation and storage equipment enabled significantly different processing, the result being the introduction of three new brands. The brewery has an annual maximum capacity of 600,000 hectolitres.

Kalnapilis won two gold awards at the 2004 World Beer Cup, the Olympics of beer competitions; one in the German Style Heller Bock or Maibock category, for 'Kalnapilis 7.3', and one in the Muenchener style Helles category, for 'Kalnapilis Original'.

In 2007, "Kalnapilis" introduced a new type of beer "3 malts". In 2007, "Kalnapilis" became the major sponsor of the basketball club "Žalgiris", but already in 2008, after reducing the support, it lost this name.

The brand has a significant presence in sports advertising, and promotes a sporty image.
