= Amsterdam Brewing Company =

Brewery in Toronto, Ontario

- Industry: Alcoholic beverage
- Founded: September 1986
- Headquarters: Toronto, Ontario, Canada
- Products: Beer
- Owner: Royal Unibrew
- Website: amsterdambeer.com

The Amsterdam Brewing Company is a brewery in Toronto, Ontario, Canada. It was founded by Dutchman Roel Bramer and is now headed by Jeff Carefoote.

== History ==
The company began in September 1986 as The Amsterdam Brasserie and Brewpub in a former tire re-treading plant on John Street in the then nascent Toronto Entertainment District. A second brewpub location with a larger brewing capacity was opened as The Rotterdam on King Street West in 1988. In 1993, the former was closed, and operations were consolidated at the latter under the current name The Amsterdam Brewing Company, with a focus as a microbrewery. The company subsequently moved to a location on Bathurst Street near Fort York.

In 2003, Amsterdam Brewing purchased Kawartha Lakes Brewing of Peterborough, Ontario which produced KLB Raspberry Wheat, KLB IPA, KLB Nut Brown and KLB Cream Ale.

On November 1, 2012, the company moved to 45 Esandar Drive, directly east of the new Leaside Village retail area. The brewery moved to a larger facility in order to accommodate the growth of the Amsterdam brand. In May 2013 the company partnered with family run hospitality group Urban Dining Group, Headed by Todd Sherman, Together they would become equal partners on the Amsterdam Brewhouse, a brew pub on the Toronto waterfront at 245 Queens Quay West. In October 2017, The Urban Dining Group and AMSTERDAM beer company opened a second brewpub in Leaside near the main brewery to better serve the Leaside community, called the Amsterdam Barrel House.

On July 15, 2022, a Denmark-based Royal Unibrew entered into an agreement to purchase the brewery for CA$44,000,000 (approx. US$34,000,000). The acquisition, which includes a brewery and two brewpub restaurants, is intended to help Royal Unibrew expand into the Americas. The deal was finalized on September 15, 2022.

== Beers ==
- 3 Speed (Lager)
- Cruiser (Pale ale)
- Big Wheel (Lager)
- Blonde (Lager)
- BoneShaker (IPA)
- Fracture (IPA)
- Pale Rider (Mix of Lager and IPA)
- Space Invader (IPA)
- Downtown Brown (Nut Brown Ale)

== See also ==
- Beer in Canada
