= Faxe Kondi =

Danish soft drink

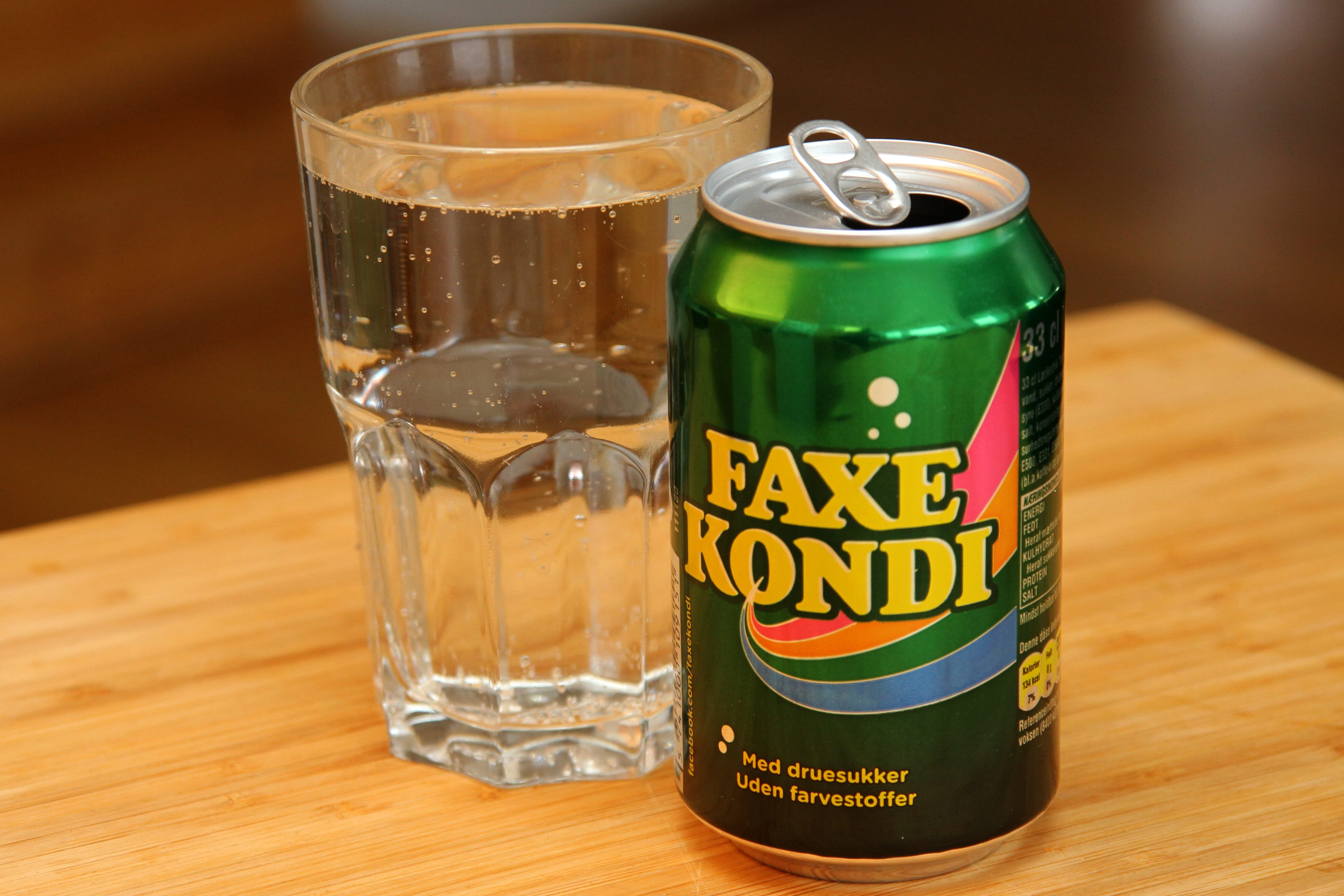
- Can of Faxe Kondi (2018)
- Manufacturer: Royal Unibrew
- Website: faxekondi.dk

Faxe Kondi is a Danish soft drink produced by Royal Unibrew through Faxe Bryggeri since 1971. Originally it was sold in beer bottles, as Faxe Bryggeri was primarily a beer brewing company. It is marketed as a sports drink.

In addition to the original Faxe Kondi soft drink, several variants have been introduced over time. These include a sugar-free version, Faxe Kondi Zero Calories, as well as limited-edition seasonal variants released annually since 2016 or 2017 with changing flavours.

In 2023, Royal Unibrew introduced an orange-flavoured variant, Faxe Kondi Appelsin, which is also available in a zero-calorie version.

From 1996 to 2001, Faxe Bryggeri sponsored the Faxe Kondi name in the Danish Superliga (as Faxe Kondi Ligaen) and Danish 1st Division (as Faxe Kondi Divisionen).

== Faxe Kondi Booster ==
Faxe Kondi Booster is a line of energy drinks produced by Royal Unibrew under the Faxe Kondi brand. Unlike the original soft drink, Booster products contain caffeine and are marketed as energy drinks.

The original Faxe Kondi Booster was initially sold primarily in Denmark, but later expanded into other markets, including Finland. The range has since been extended with additional variants such as Faxe Kondi Booster Pineapple Boost and Faxe Kondi Booster Twisted Ice Zero, which offer different flavour profiles.

== Availability outside Denmark ==
The Faxe drinks hold a particularly strong market position in Greenland, where they were bottled in Nuuk by Nuuk Imeq until 2023, when local production ceased. Since then, Faxe Kondi has been imported ready-bottled, but it continues to hold a significant market share in the territory. In Norway, the 0.33L can versions (Regular and Light) are sold by the Normal discount chain; an attempt in 2024 at selling only the light versions in Coop Norge stores flopped, in part as their distributor Hansa Borg Bryggerier admitted to simply trying to get into Norway's diet soda hype and were incorrectly marketing Faxe Kondi Light as being the "original" Faxe Kondi. In Iceland, the 0.33L can versions are sold. In the Faroe Islands, Faxe Kondi is sold in 0.33L cans as well as 0.25, 0.5, 1.5L, and 2.0L bottles.

Starting June 5th, 2026, Faxe Kondi is also available in Malmö, with plans to expand to the entirety of Sweden
