= Søren Krogh =

Danish footballer and coach (born 1977)

Personal information
- Date of birth: April 19, 1977 (age 49)
- Place of birth: Denmark
- Height: 1.82 m (5 ft 11 1/2 in)
- Position: Midfielder

Youth career
- Lemvig
- Holstebro

Senior career*
Years	Team	Apps	(Gls)
1995–1996	Holstebro		
1997–2002	Brøndby	43	(1)
2002–2004	BK Frem	46	(3)
2004–2008	Nordsjælland	41	(1)
2008–2009	BK Frem	0	(0)
2009–2011	BGA		

Managerial career
- 2023–2025: OB
- * Club domestic league appearances and goals

Søren Krogh (born April 19, 1977) is a Danish football coach and former professional football midfielder. He was most recently the manager of Danish Superliga club OB.

== Career ==
=== Coaching career ===
In July 2009 it was confirmed, that Krogh had joined Danish club BGA as a playing-assistant coach under manager Thomas Maale. In the summer 2011, Krogh joined his former club FC Nordsjælland as assistant coach for the U-19 team. He was promoted then promoted to the first team in July 2015, where he also would function as assistant coach. Two years later, in July 2017, he signed a contract extension with Nordsjælland. On 10 December 2019 Nordsjælland confirmed, that Krough would leave the club to join AaB.

AaB confirmed the arrival of Krogh as the club's new head of football on 10 December 2019, from the beginning of 2020. In November 2020 Krogh revealed, that he would leave his position at the end of the season, as he wanted to return coaching. However, he left the club already on 18 January 2022, when he was announced as the new assistant coach of Andreas Alm at Danish Superliga club OB.

Following the sacking of Alm in November 2023, Krogh promoted to manager of OB. In the 2024-25 season he won the Danish 1st Division with OB. He was despite the title win replaced with German manager Alexander Zorniger, as the club felt they 'needed more experience'.
