= Fortia AB =

Swedish sovereign wealth fund

Fortia AB, a Swedish government-owned holding company and National Wealth Fund set up in 1990 to support the industrial development in Sweden through a number of larger holdings including; Celsius Industrier AB, FFV AB, LKAB, NcB AB, Procordia AB (including its shares in Pharmacia AB), AB Statens Skogsindustrier (ASSI), SSAB Svenskt Stål, Sveriges Geologiska AB (SGAB), Cementa AB samt SIB-Invest AB. Some holding are taken over by Stattum, when closed down in 1991.
