= Statsföretag =

Swedish national wealth fund

Statsföretag was a Swedish government holding company and national wealth fund for more than 20 years. The company was created by the Swedish Parliament to centralize and consolidate state ownership of public commercial assets especially within heavy industries such as shipyard, steel and forestry. During the economic crisis of the 1970s in Sweden, several other assets were nationalized and the activities of the company became organized along multiple industrial segments.

After severe losses, the company was restructured in 1983 and renamed Procordia, with a number of industrial assets such as ASSI, LKAB and SSAB transferred and held directly by the Ministry of Industry

In 1987, the company was partially privatized and the state participation reduced to 81%. The company shares were listed on October 15, 1987, on the Stockholm Stock Exchange. In 1990 Procordia was merged with the pharmaceutical company Pharmacia and the food company Provendor owned by Volvo. Consequently, the main owners became Volvo and the Swedish government. The government shares were held through the wholly owned national wealth fund Fortia and subsequently Stattum

In 1992, with the acquisition of Swedish Match the company was divided into two separate sub-holdings, being the pharmaceutical segment in Pharmacia and the food segment in Branded Consumer Products. Volvo became the main owner in Branded Consumer Products and ultimately the sole owner in 1994, changing the name to Procordia Food. In 1995 Procordia Food was acquired by the Norwegian food company Orkla and Pharmacia merged with the US pharmaceutical company Upjohn and became Pharmacia & Upjohn.

In January 1999, Stattum, the Swedish National Wealth Fund sold the Swedish government's remaining 7% in the pharmaceuticals group Pharmacia & Upjohn in a EUR 1.8bn share offering.
