= Faxe Brewery =

Brewery in Faxe, Denmark

- Location: Faxe, Denmark
- Opened: 1901
- Owned by: Royal Unibrew

Active beers
Name	Type
Faxe Premium	Lager
Faxe Red	Fruit Beer
Faxe Festbock	Bock
Faxe Amber	Lager
Faxe Strong	Hi % Lager
Faxe Extra Strong	Hi % Lager
Faxe Free	Non Alc. Lager
Faxe 10%	Hi % Lager
Faxe Pilsner	Lager
Faxe Fad	Lager
Faxe Classic	Lager
Faxe Gold	Lager
Faxe 7.1	Hi % Lager
Faxe Royal Export	Lager

Faxe Brewery is a Danish brewery located in the town of Faxe. The brewery was founded in 1901 by Nikoline and Conrad Nielsen. It was called Fakse Dampbryggeri, but after her husband's death, Nikoline christened the brewery Faxe Bryggeri. It is best known for its strong export beers. In 1989 Faxe Bryggeri merged with Bryggerigruppen, which later developed into Royal Unibrew. It is known around Germany for its 5% 1 litre cans, North America for its 8% and 10% 500mL cans, and Denmark, where it is produced, especially in Norway and Greenland. In addition to beer, it produces soft drinks such as Faxe Kondi, Nikoline, Ceres Red Soda, Thor Passion, Albani Tonic Water and Pepsi, Mountain Dew, 7 Up and Mirinda by license from USA.

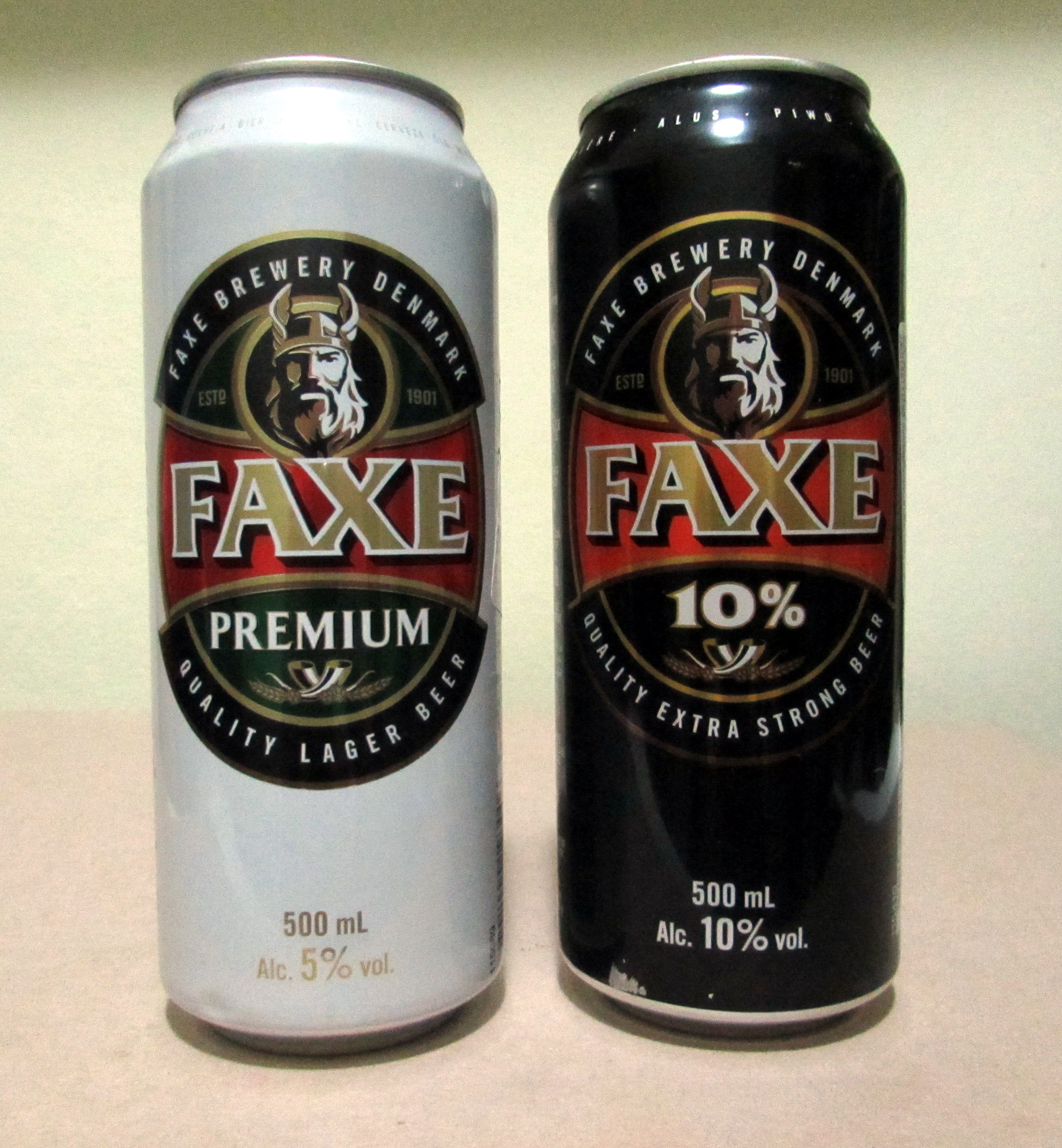
Faxe Premium 5 % and Faxe Premium 10 %

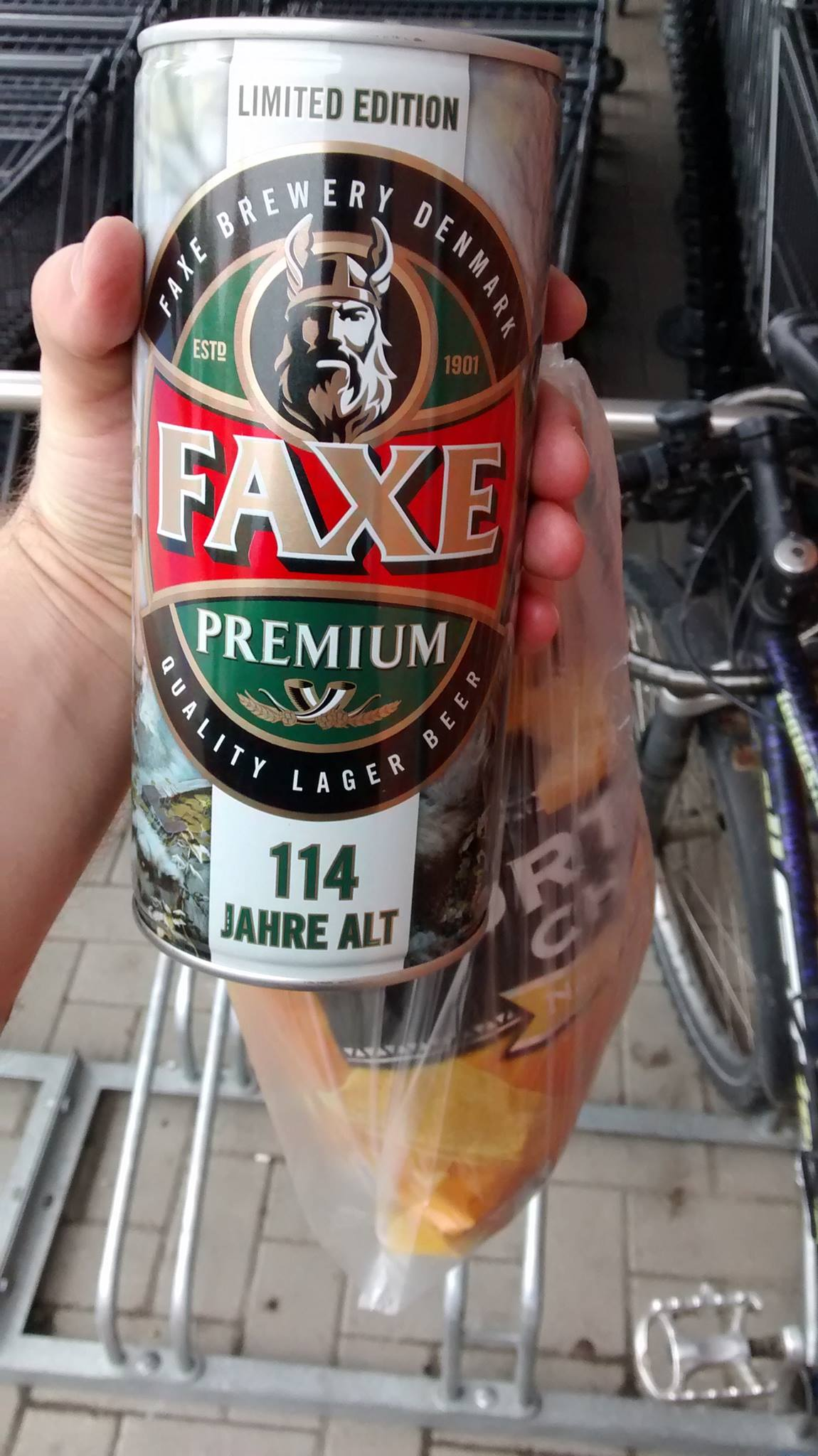
Faxe Premium Beer Limited Edition

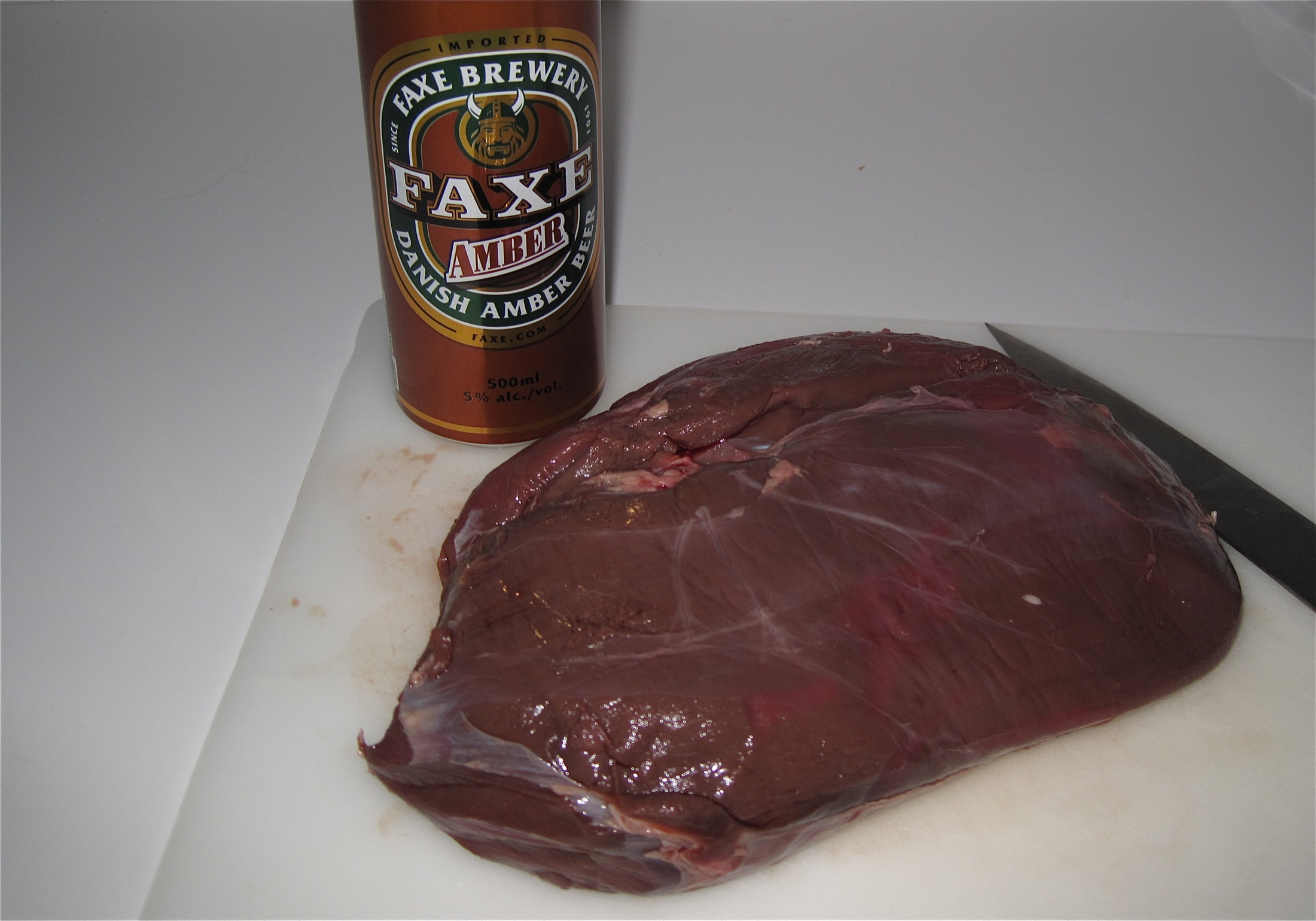
Faxe Premium Amber

== History ==
=== The young widow's successful brewery ===
The brewery in Faxe was founded in 1901 under the name Fakse Dampbryggeri by Nikoline and Conrad Nielsen. After Conrad Nielsen died in 1914, his young widow continued to run the company with great success. At the end of the 1920s, Faxe Bryggeri, as the company was renamed in 1914, supplied exceptionally mild ale but also carbonated soft drinks to most of Zealand, Lolland-Falster, and the Copenhagen Area.

The brewery grew concurrently with its sales success resulting in a problem: water shortage. In the 1930s, it was necessary to drill a well to ensure access to enough water. At 80 metres, they reached the limestone-filtered water on which Faxe Bryggeri has since based its production. The water turned out to be excellent as a mineral water and in beer, and Faxe Bryggeri now began to make a name for itself with lager and strong beers in its sales area.

=== New generations ===
In 1945, Nikoline retired, and Faxe Bryggeri was converted into a partnership headed by her three sons. In 1956, the brewery was converted into a limited company, and under the brothers' management, the brewery steadily expanded until 1960. During that period, the three brothers all died within three years. In 1960, Nikoline's grandson, Bent Bryde-Nielsen, became head of Faxe Bryggeri. This was followed by a period of expansion, new product launches, and the introduction of new marketing and distribution principles.

=== ”Der grosse Däne” ===
Faxe gradually became one of Denmark's most dynamic breweries. The 1970s were golden years for the southern Zealand company: the draught beer Faxe Fad was launched in cans and bottles, and the Danes were offered people's shares in the brewery.

In the 1980s, Faxe made significant investments in sales and marketing and the brewery's production facilities, producing beer and soft drinks for domestic and international markets. Especially Germans and Swedes appreciated the taste of Faxe's beer. “Den store dansken” and “Der grosse Däne” (the Great Dane), inspired by Faxe Fad, is how many Swedes and Germans know the beer today.

Then there was the success of Faxe Kondi - today among the leading brands of soft drinks in Denmark. Faxe Kondi was developed in 1971 in cooperation with Knud Lundberg, a sports physician and star footballer.

=== Major investments and high technology ===
In 1989, Faxe Bryggeri merged with Jyske Bryggerier to form Denmark's second-largest brewery company, now known as Royal Unibrew. In 1997–98, Faxe was expanded with a new basement building with tanks that can hold up to 600,000 litres, and a new can line, which can tap 90,000 cans per hour. In 1999, DKK 115 million was invested in a high-tech and fully automated multi-story warehouse with room for 18,500 pallets.
