= Tauras =

- Opened: 1860
- Owner: Royal Unibrew

Active beers
Name	Type
Brandusis
Ekstra
Pilsneris	Pilsner
Stiprusis
Taurusis	Pale lager
Tradicinis	Pale lager

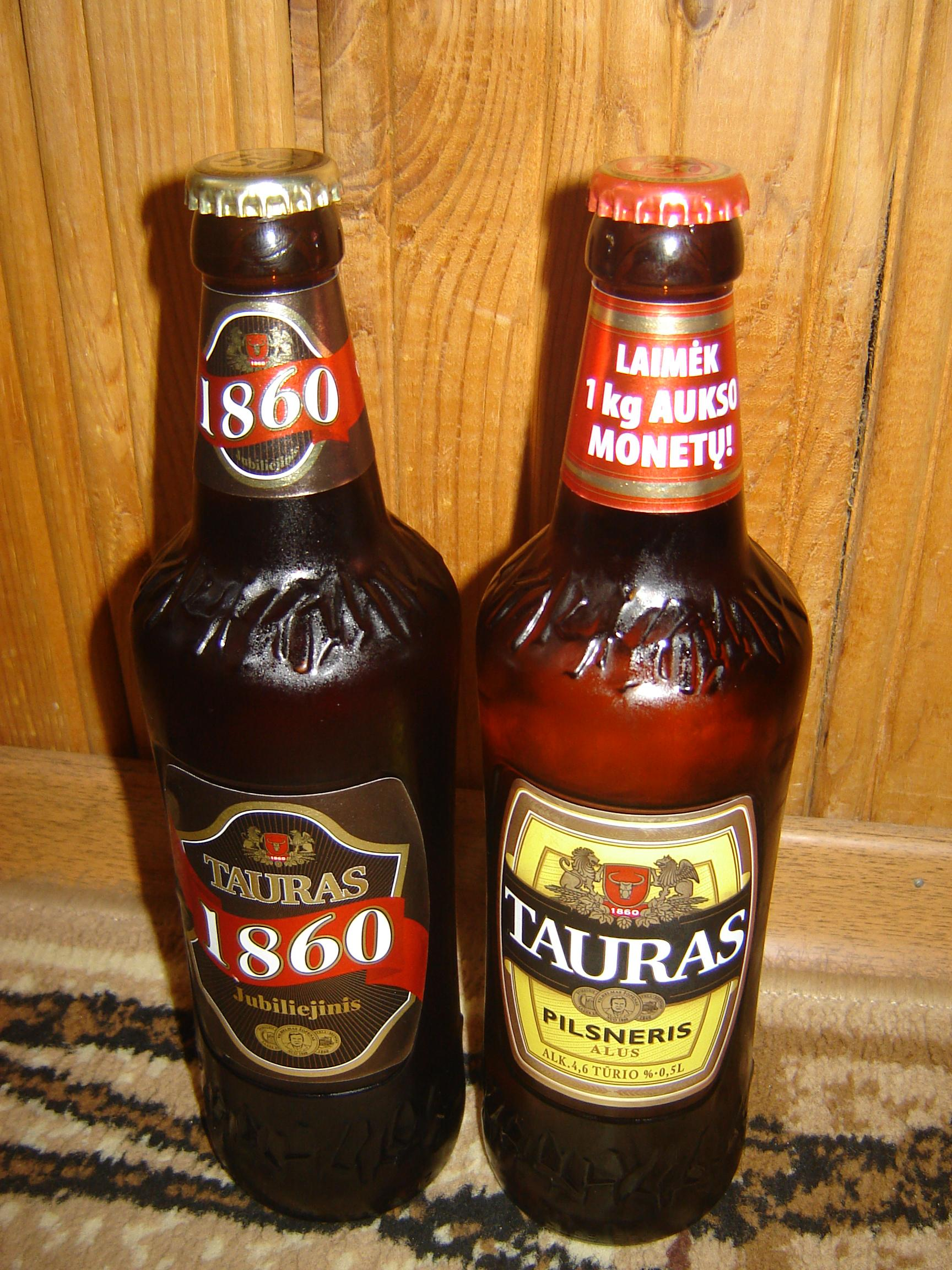
Tauras 1860 Jubiliejinis & Tauras Pilsneris bottles.

Tauras, formerly known as Vilniaus Tauras, was a Lithuanian brewery, established in Vilnius in 1860. Tauras was taken over by Royal Unibrew in 2001. It is a part of Kalnapilio-Tauro grupė.

== History ==
The original brewery was founded in 1860 in Vilna, then in the Russian Empire. The firm was located in the borough of Lukiškės, right outside the city's limits. The original founders were two local Jewish entrepreneurs: Abel Sołowiejczyk and Iser Berg Wolf. However, around 1866, the brewery adopted the name of one of the founders' associates, Wilhelm Szopen, possibly because of the latter's surname being similar to the name of a highly popular Polish-French composer Fryderyk Chopin (sometimes written as Fryderyk Szopen in Polish). With time, Wilhelm Szopen indeed became the owner of the brewery, though its founders continued to run the daily business matters.

Being merely one of many breweries in that part of Russian Empire, it competed with the breweries of the Lipski brothers, as well as Parczewski's brewery in Raudondvaris (then called Czerwony Dwór). However, with time it expanded significantly. By the early 1890s, the firm had more than 50 workers and produced up to 300,000 buckets of beer — a common unit of measurement in brewing and vodka-making industry in 19th century Russia and corresponding to roughly 12.3 litres. In 1897, the brewery was taken over by Morduch Owsiej Epstein, a wealthy businessman. He combined the brewery with another local brewery he owned located in the Vilnian suburb of Popławy (modern Paupys, now a part of the city) and turned the company into a joint-stock company named Towarzystwo Akcyjne Browaru Szopen — Joint-stock Company of the Szopen Brewery.

The new company had 0.5 million rubles at its disposal and hired up to 250 workers. Epstein significantly modernized the brewery and by 1909, it had four electrical motors and a diesel engine running the brewing process — a novelty in early-20th-century Europe. Such investments allowed for the brewery to almost monopolize the local market: the yearly production prior to World War I reached 800 thousand buckets, that is almost 10,000 hectolitres. Roughly half of beer sold in the local market was branded with Szopen's logo.

After the war the company was experiencing difficulties. However, it continued to grow and send its beers to other towns within Poland. The capital stock rose to 810,000 złoty and new agencies were opened in Warsaw, Lida, Lwów and other towns. Although the Great Depression of late 1920s stroke the business, the yearly production rate continued to increase and reached 30,000 hectolitres in the early 1930s. The crisis also weakened the competitors, with Parczewski's brewery going bankrupt in 1930. This put the brewery, along with Warsaw's Haberbusch i Schiele and the Żywiec Brewery, among the 15 largest breweries in Poland.

Following the German and Soviet invasion of Poland of 1939, the town of Vilnius was passed to Lithuania. The company name was Lithuanised to Šopen in 1940. However, later the same year Lithuania was occupied by the Soviet Union and the brewery, like all other privately owned companies, was nationalized. Merged with several smaller producers of beer and soft drinks, the company was renamed to its current name, Tauras Brewery, shortly after the end of World War II, in 1945.

In 2001, Tauras Brewery was merged with Kalnapilis into AB “Kalnapilio – Tauro grupė”, owned by Danish Royal Unibrew. In 2006, it was decided to stop production in Vilnius and move it from Tauras brewery to Kalnapilis Brewery in Panevėžys.
