= Albani Brewery =

Brewery in Odense, Denmark

Coordinates: 55°23′45″N 10°23′45″E

Albani Bryggerierne A/S
- Industry: Alcoholic beverage
- Founded: 1859
- Products: Beer
- Owner: Royal Unibrew

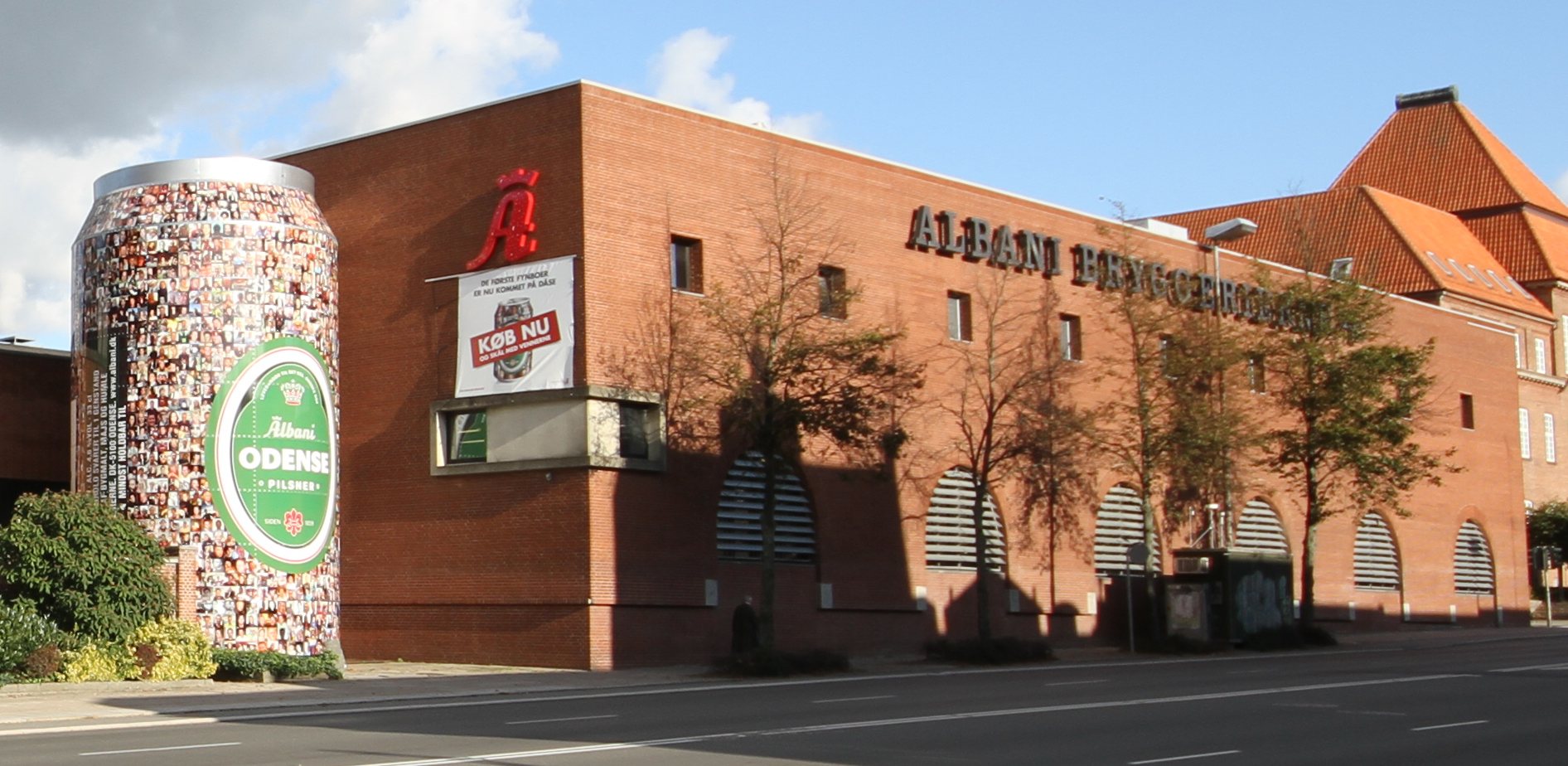
Albani's front towards Albanigade in Odense.

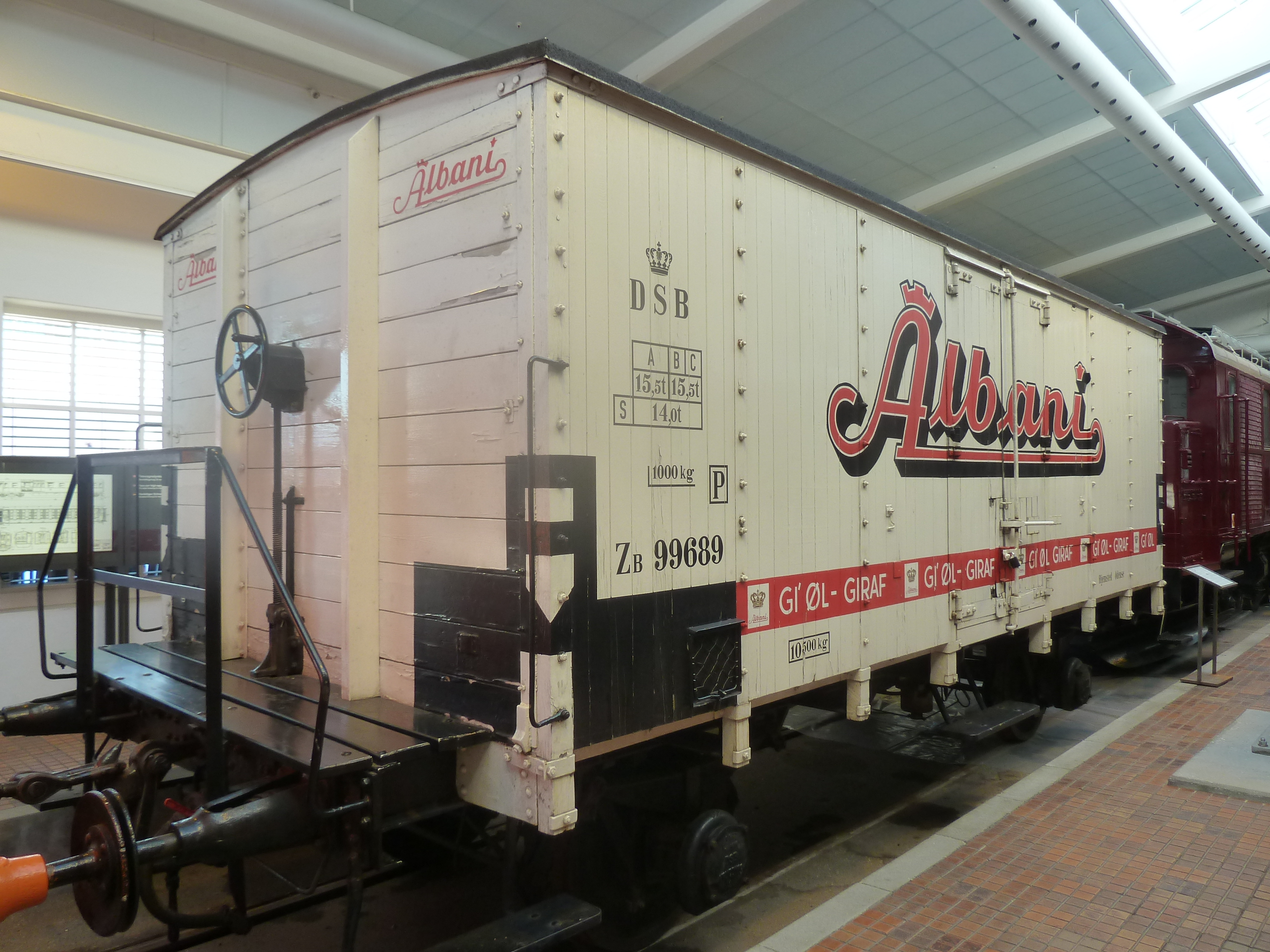
Albani beer in a wagon.

Albani Bryggerierne A/S (lit. 'Albani Breweries') is a brewery located in Odense, Denmark, and the vast majority of its customers live on the island of Funen. The brewery was founded by MPharm Theodor Schiøtz in 1859. In 2000, the brewery merged with Bryggerigruppen with the Brewery group (now known as Royal Unibrew), a group of Danish regional breweries.

Albani is most known for its pilsners: Odense Pilsner and Odense Classic.

== Beers ==
Odense Pilsner is a pilsener with 4.6% ABV. The taste is balanced between malt and fruit. Two different varieties of hops are used, both come from Hallertau in Germany. It has been brewed since 1934 and was originally not part of the Albani Brewery's portfolio, but was introduced to the product line with the acquisition of Bryggeriet Odense.

Odense Classic is a pilsener with 4.6% ABV. It has a darker colour than ordinary beers of the same type. The beer has a more rounded, but still powerful taste of malt and hops. It was introduced at the brewery's 140th anniversary in 1999.

Odense Rød Classic (lit. 'Odense Red Classic') is a Vienna lager with 4.6% ABV. A mixture of dark caramel malt and Münchener malt is used. The result is a dark beer with a somewhat rounded taste. The colour is dark golden red, which might be the source of the name.

Giraf Beer is a strong pilsener which is produced in two varieties: red (7.3% ABV) and black (10% ABV). It was first brewed in 1962, when Odense Zoo's giraffe (Danish: giraf) Kalle was found dead, as the Albani Breweries had previously used this giraffe in its advertisement, it decided to create a special beer, the profits of which would be spent on purchasing a new giraffe for the zoo. The first year's production raised enough funds to buy two giraffes for the zoo.

HC Andersen is a strong ale-type beer with 9% ABV. It was first brewed in 1988 when the Albani Breweries decided to create a special beer to celebrate Odense's 1,000th anniversary. The beer became so popular that Albani decided to keep it as a part of its product range. In 1989, it was marketed under its current name, honouring Hans Christian Andersen. A small batch of HC Andersen is brewed every year, and released on Andersen's birthday, April 2. Each year's labels depict a different paper cutting by Hans Christian Andersen. The bottles are also serial numbered. As a result, the beer has become a collector's item. The beer is bottom fermented and is matured longer than ordinary beer. The result is a beer with a light taste, considering its high alcohol content.

Albani produces two Christmas beers: Blålys (lit. 'Blue light'; 7% ABV) and Rødhætte (Red Riding Hood; 5.6% ABV). Blålys was introduced in 1960, and although it was not Denmark's first Christmas beer, Blålys effectively started the tradition of Danish Christmas beers. Denmark's first Christmas beer was produced by the Carlsminde brewery and had been introduced the previous year. Albani acquired Carlsminde in 1972. Both Blålys and Rødhætte are dark lagers. The label depicts the church-like Gallery Tower of the brewery cover covered in snow. This is the reason why many people originally referred to the Christmas beer as the church beer . This only lasted a few years until other breweries introduced their own Christmas beers.

Påskebryg (lit. 'Easter Brew'), is a strong pilsener with 5.6% ABV. It is the Albani Breweries' traditional beer for the Easter season. Easter beers were the first seasonal beers in Denmark, and were introduced by Carlsberg in 1905. Albani's Påskebryg was introduced in the 1950s and is brewed from a mixture of dark and light malt.

Albani also produces two light beers, Odense Light (2.6% ABV) and Odense Extra Light (0.05% ABV), as light alternatives to its original pilsener. These beers are brewed using light pilsener malt, Münchner malt, and caramel malt.

== Mergers and acquisitions ==
At the turn of the twentieth century there was a large consolidation in the Danish brewing industry, where the larger city breweries typically bought the smaller countryside breweries. Albani was part of this development, buying smaller breweries in Odense and around the island of Funen. Later, when Albani had a near monopoly on beer distribution on Funen, Albani started acquiring breweries in other parts of the country; Sønderborg Bryghus, Bryggeriet Slotsmøllen, Baldur, and Maribo Bryghus, in each case, Albani taking control of the other company. Albani Breweries A/S merged with the Royal Unibrew group in 2000.

Year	Brewery (Danish)	Brewery (English)
1905	Slotsbryggeriet i Odense	Odense Palace Brewery	Merger (name still registered)
1913	Bryggeriet Sydfyn, Faaborg	South Funen Brewery, Faaborg	Acquisition (name still registered) - later merge
1923	Bogense Bryggeri	Bogense Brewery	Acquisition (name still registered) - later merge
1934	Bryggeriet Odense	Odense Brewery	Merger (name still registered)
1956	Sønderborg Bryghus	Sønderborg Brew House	Acquisition (name vanished)
1968	Svendborg Bryghus	Svendborg Brew House	Acquisition (name still registered) - later merge
1972	Bryggeriet Carlsminde	Carlsminde Brewery	Acquisition (name still registered) - later merge
1986	Bryggeriet Slotsmøllen, Kolding	Castle Mill Brewery, Kolding	Acquisition (name still registered)
1996	Baldur Mineralsvandsfabrik	Baldur Mineral Water Plant	Acquisition (name still registered) - Sold 2000
1997	Maribo Bryghus	Maribo Brew House	Acquisition
2000	Bryggerigruppen	Royal Unibrew	Merger

Other names used by the group are:

Brewery (Original Name)	Brewery (English Translation)	Comment
Albani Bryggerierne (Albani Bryggeri, Bryggeriet Odense og Slotsbryggeriet)	Albani Breweries (Albani Brewery, Brewery Odense, and Slotsbryggeriet)	Formal company name from 1934 to 2001
Danish Beer Exporters	Danish Beer Exporters Acquisition	Only a registered name
Sønderborg Mineralvandsfabrik	Sønderborg Mineral Water Plant	Only a registered name
St. Hans Bryggeri, De Forenede Mineralvandsfabrikker	St. Hans Brewery, United Mineral Water Plants	Only a registered name
"St. Alban", "St. Knud", "St. Hanskilde", "Karolinekilde", "Thor" og "Odense Mineralvandsfabrik" i Odense	"St. Alban", "St. Knud", "St. Hanskilde", "Karolinekilde", "Thor" and "Odense Mineral Water Plant" in Odense	Only a registered name
Dansk Guldbockbryggeri	Danish Gold Bock Brewery	Only a registered name
Dansk Påskebockbryggeri	Danish Easter Bock Brewery	Only a registered name
Dansk Majbockbryggeri	Danish May Bock Brewery	Only a registered name
Dansk Julebockbryggeri	Danish Christmas Bock Brewery	Only a registered name
Mosteriet Abild, Haastrup	The Cider Mill Abild, Haastrup	Only a registered name
Giraf Bryggeriet	Giraf Brewery	National brand name
Giraf Breweries	Giraf Breweries	International brand name (Giraf Bryggerierne in English)
Albani Breweries	Albani Breweries	International brand name (Albani Bryggerierne in English)

== Hans Christian Andersen ==
Denmark's best known poet and author, Hans Christian Andersen, was very fond of Albani beers. In a letter to a friend he described Albani beer as: Jeg kan ikke rose denne øl højt nok. Den er forfriskende, delikat og stærk. Prøv den! ("I cannot recommend this beer enough. It is refreshing, savoury and strong. Try it!") This quote is occasionally used in the company's marketing.
