= Royal Unibrew =

Brewing and beverage company in Faxe, Denmark

Royal Unibrew A/S
- Location: Faxe, Denmark
- Annual production volume: 14.1 million hectolitres (12,000,000 US bbl)
- Revenue: ▲DKK 15.04 billion (2024) (US$2.18 billion)
- Operating income: ▼DKK 1.97 billion (2024) (US$285.45 million)
- Net income: ▼DKK 1.46 billion (2024) (US$212.34 million)
- Assets: ▲DKK 17.89 billion (2024) (US$2.59 billion)
- Owner: Public; Nasdaq Copenhagen: RBREW

Active beers
Name	Type
Royal Export
Royal Selection
Royal Stout	Stout
Royal Pilsner	Lager
Royal Classic	Lager
Royal Red	Lager
Albani Odense Pilsner	Lager
Ceres Top	Lager
Faxe Fad	Lager
Thor Pilsner	Lager
Maribo Pilsner	Lager
Slots Pilsner	Lager

Other beers
Karlens Pilsner and Royal Karlens Pilsner, Karlens Classic, Karlens Julebryg, Karlens Påskebryg, Odin Pilsner, Pokal Classic, Royal Unibrew
Name	Type

Royal Unibrew is a brewing and beverage company headquartered in Faxe, Denmark. Its brands include Ceres, Faxe, Albani, Thor, Karlens and Royal. Royal Unibrew also has a strong presence in the Baltic region, where it owns Tauras, Kalnapilis (both in Lithuania), and Lāčplēša Alus (in Latvia), and Finland, where it owns Hartwall. As of 2018 it owns the brewery in France that produces the Lorina soft drink brand. It also brews and markets Heineken and Pepsi in Denmark.

== History ==
The company was founded in 1989 through the merger of the breweries Faxe, Ceres and Thor under the name Bryggerigruppen. Odense-based Albani merged with the company in 2000. In 2005, the name of the company was changed to Royal Unibrew.

== Operations ==
=== Denmark ===
Royal Unibrew is the second largest beer company in Denmark with a market share of about 25%.

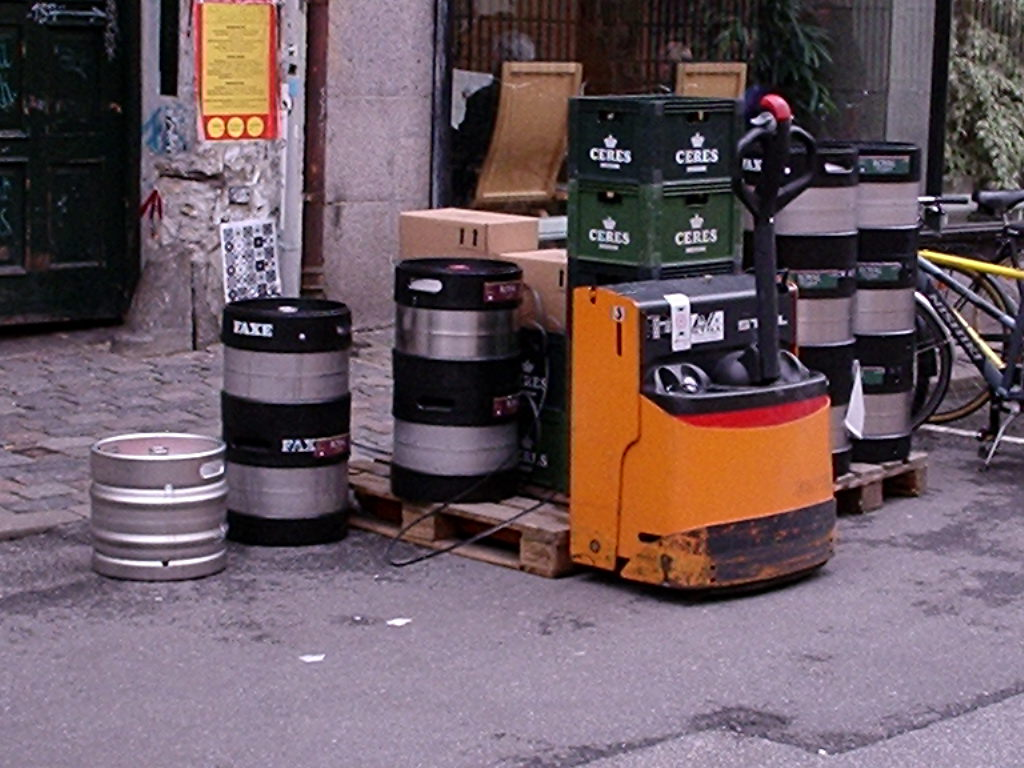
Ceres beer and Faxe beer.

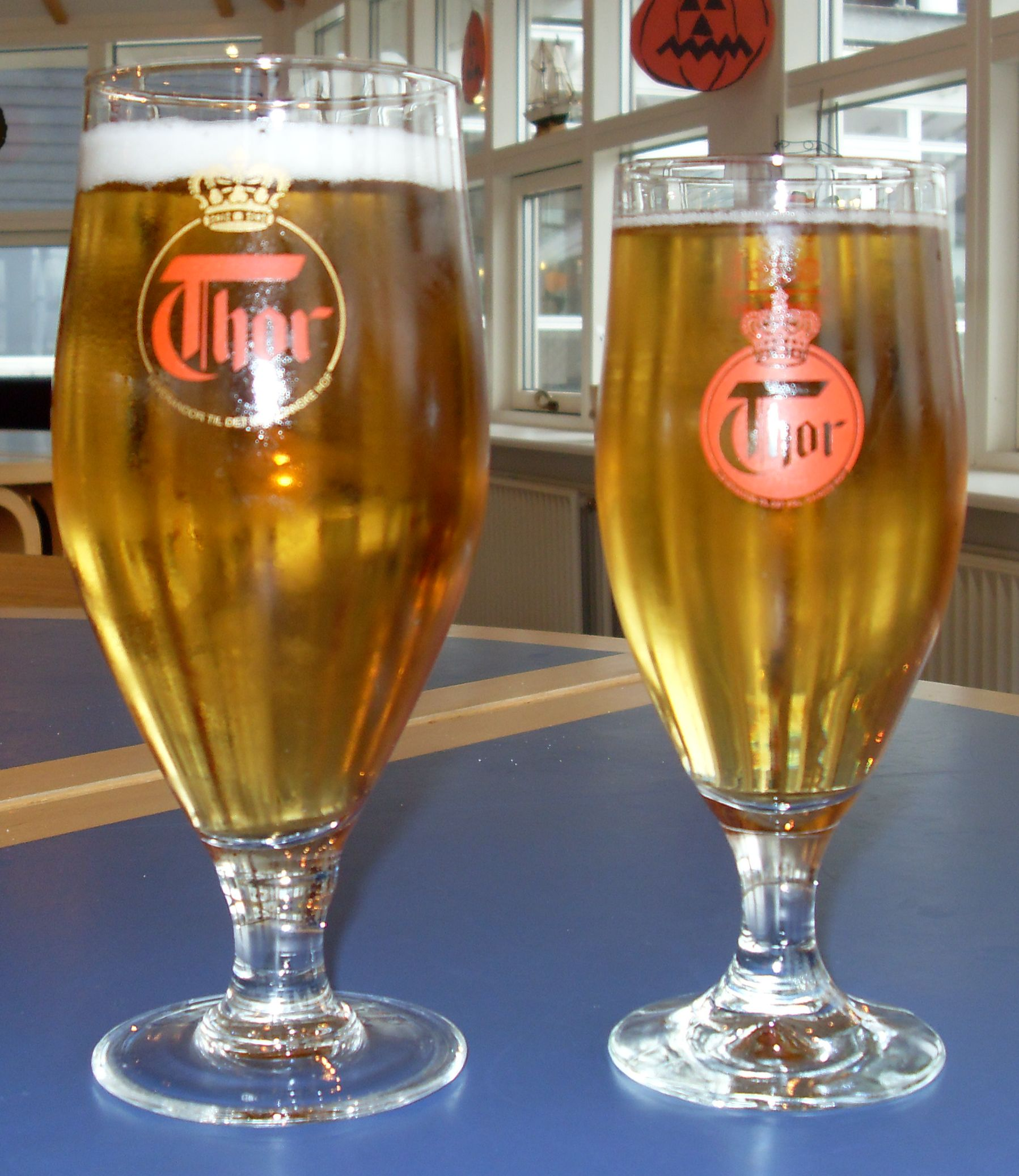
Thor, a Thor beer.

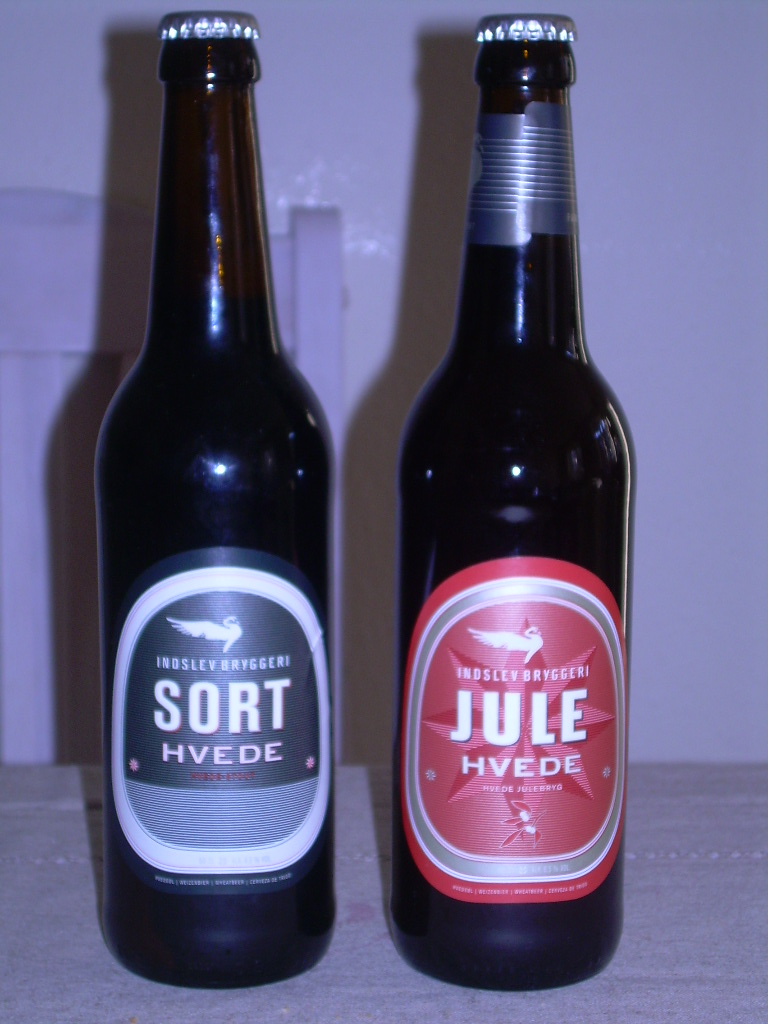
Indslev wheat and Christmas beer.

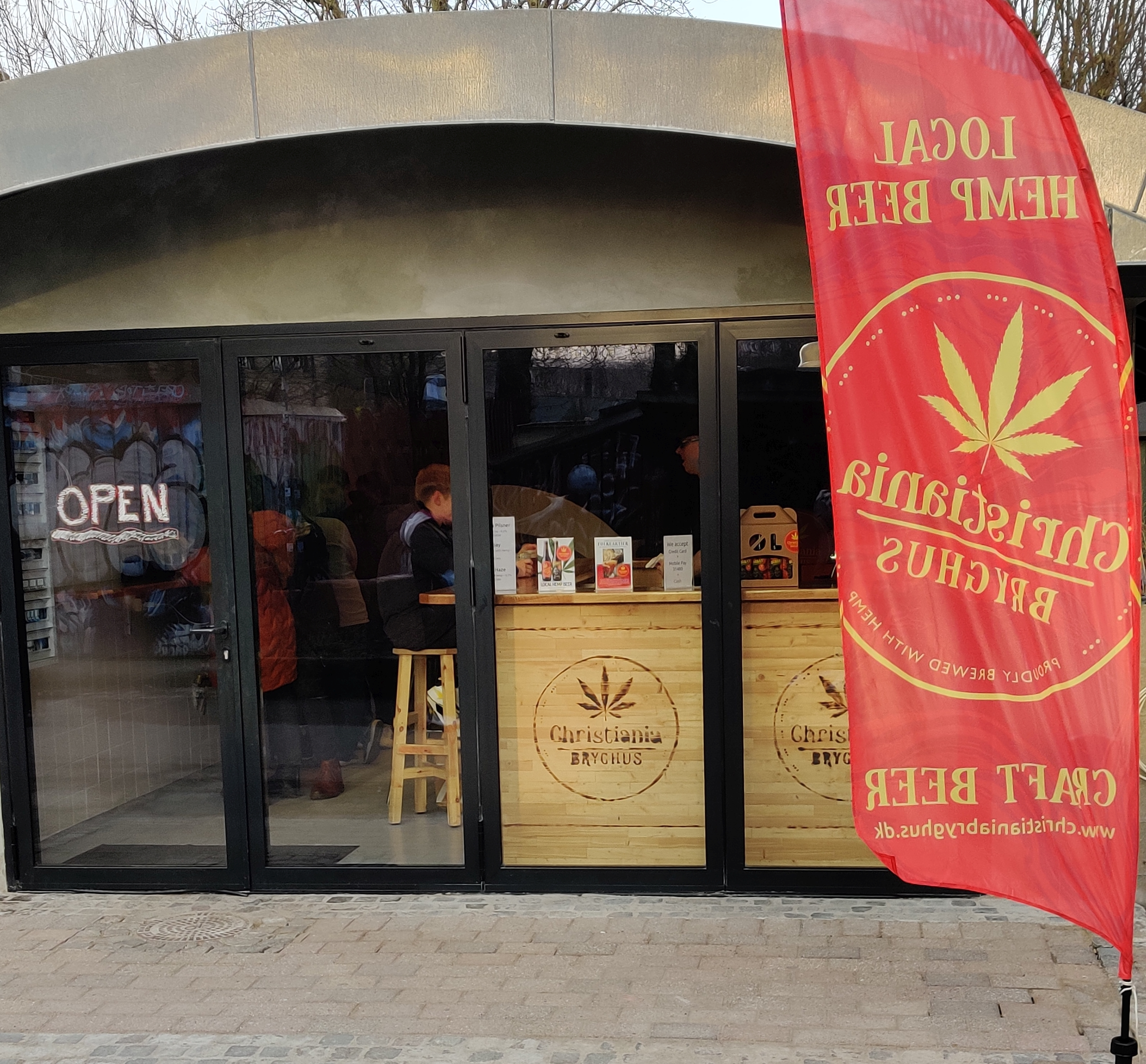
Christiania Bryghus, The Lab

=== Baltic countries and Poland ===
Royal Unibrew acquired Lithuanian breweries Vilniaus Tauras and Kalnapilis in 2001 and a controlling interest in Latvian brewery Lāčplēša Alus in 2004. The company also owns the Latvian soft drink company Cido and Tanker Brewery in Estonia.

Royal Unibrew entered the Polish beer market with the acquisition of Browary Polskie Brok-Strzelec S.A. in April 2005. It was followed by the acquisition of Browar Łomża in 2007. In December 2010, Van Pur Breweries bought the Polish branch of the Danish Royal Unibrew group. In exchange, Royal Unibrew received 20% of shares of Van Pur in Poland with Van Pur retaining buyers options of the shares. In 2011 Van Pur, owned five breweries with the total production capacity of 4 million hectolitre of beer annually. October 15, 2012 Van Pur exercised its buyers option on the 20% shares previously held by Royal Unibrew for 111 million PLN.

=== France ===
In 2018 the soft drink brewery that produces the brand Lorina was acquired.

== List of subsidiaries ==
Brewery	Country
Albani Bryggeriene A/S	Denmark
Amsterdam Brewing Company	Canada
Bryggeriet Alliance	Denmark
Bryggeriet Fuglsang	Denmark
Bryggeriet Slotsmøllen	Denmark
Bryggeriet Vendia	Denmark
Carlsminde Bryggeri	Denmark
Ceres Bryggeriet	Denmark
Christiania Bryghus, The Lab	Denmark
Cido	Latvia
Etablissements Geyer Frère	France
Faxe	Denmark
Graffs Bryggeri	Denmark
Hansa Borg Bryggerier	Norway
Hartwall	Finland
Indslev Bryggeri	Denmark
Kalnapilis	Lithuania
Karlsens	Denmark
Lāčplēša Alus	Latvia
Lemonsoda	Italy
Līvu Alus	Latvia
Lolland-Falsters Bryggeri	Denmark
Maribo Bryghus	Denmark
Nørrebro Bryghus	Denmark
Odin Bryggeriet	Denmark
P. Pedersen Bryggeriet	Denmark
Slotsbryggeriet	Denmark
Svendborg Bryggeri	Denmark
Sønderborg Eksportbryggeri	Denmark
Tauras	Lithuania
Tanker	Estonia
Thor Bryggeri	Denmark
Urban	Denmark
Vrumona	Netherlands

== Royal Brand ==
The largest brand of Unibrew is Royal. It is based on Ceres' Ceres Royal Export and Faxe's Faxe Pilsner/Classic. Royal Export was also brewed by the other breweries in the group, but later the Pilsner and Classic were added to make a complete family of beer as is traditional in Denmark.

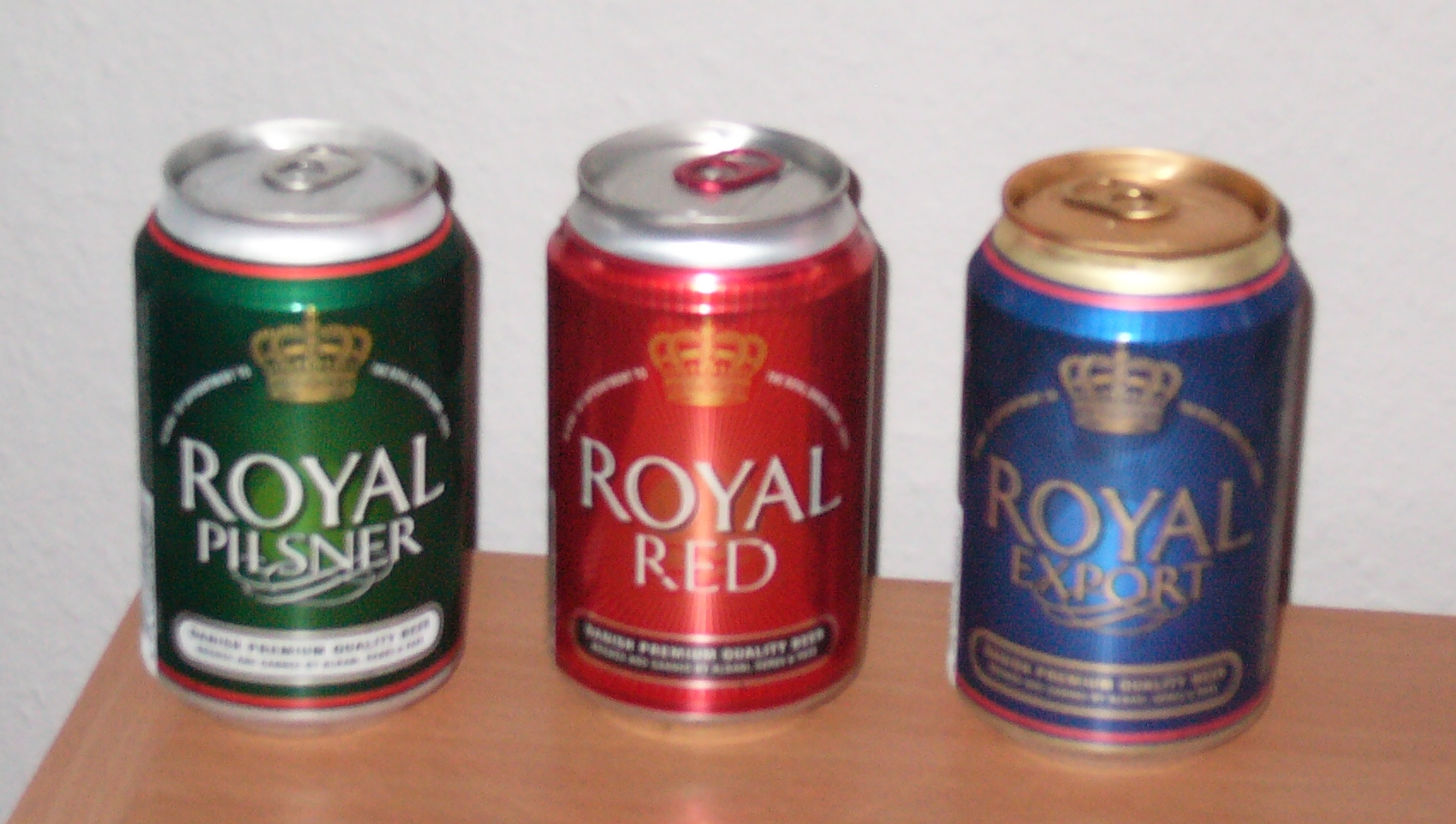
Ceres, Royal beer.

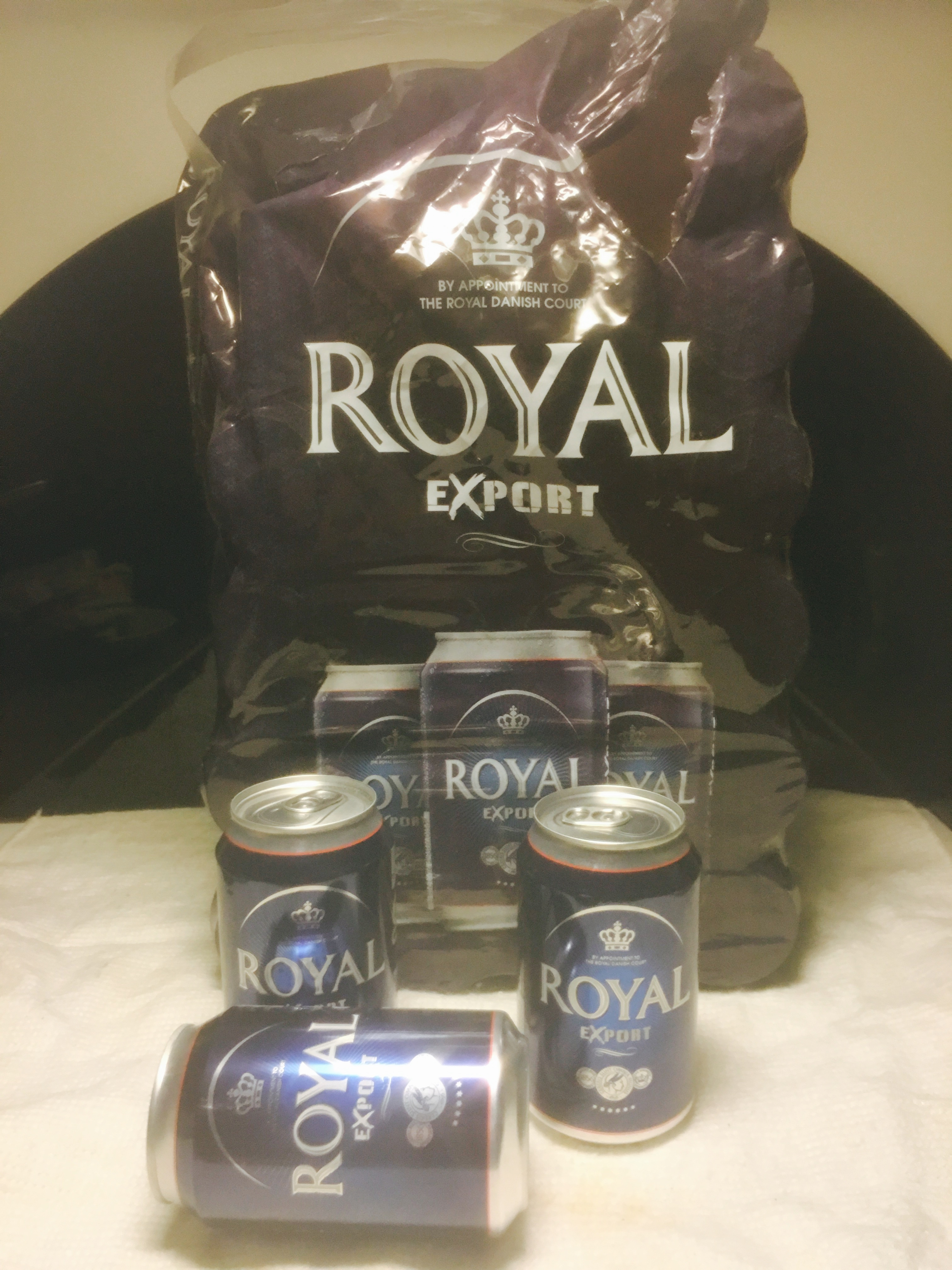
Royal Export beer.

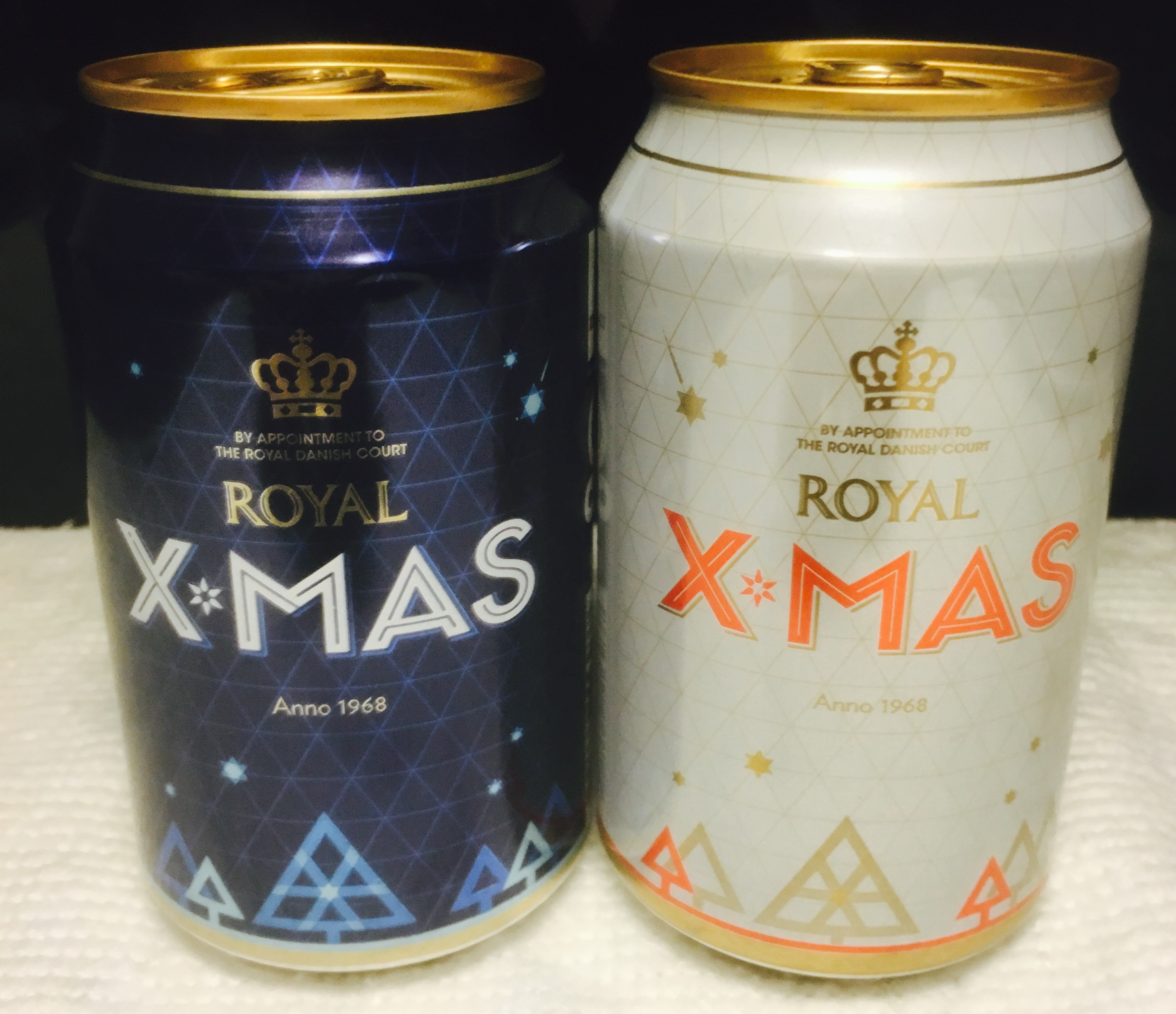
Royal Christmas beer.

== See also ==
- Beer in Denmark
