= Beer in Poland =

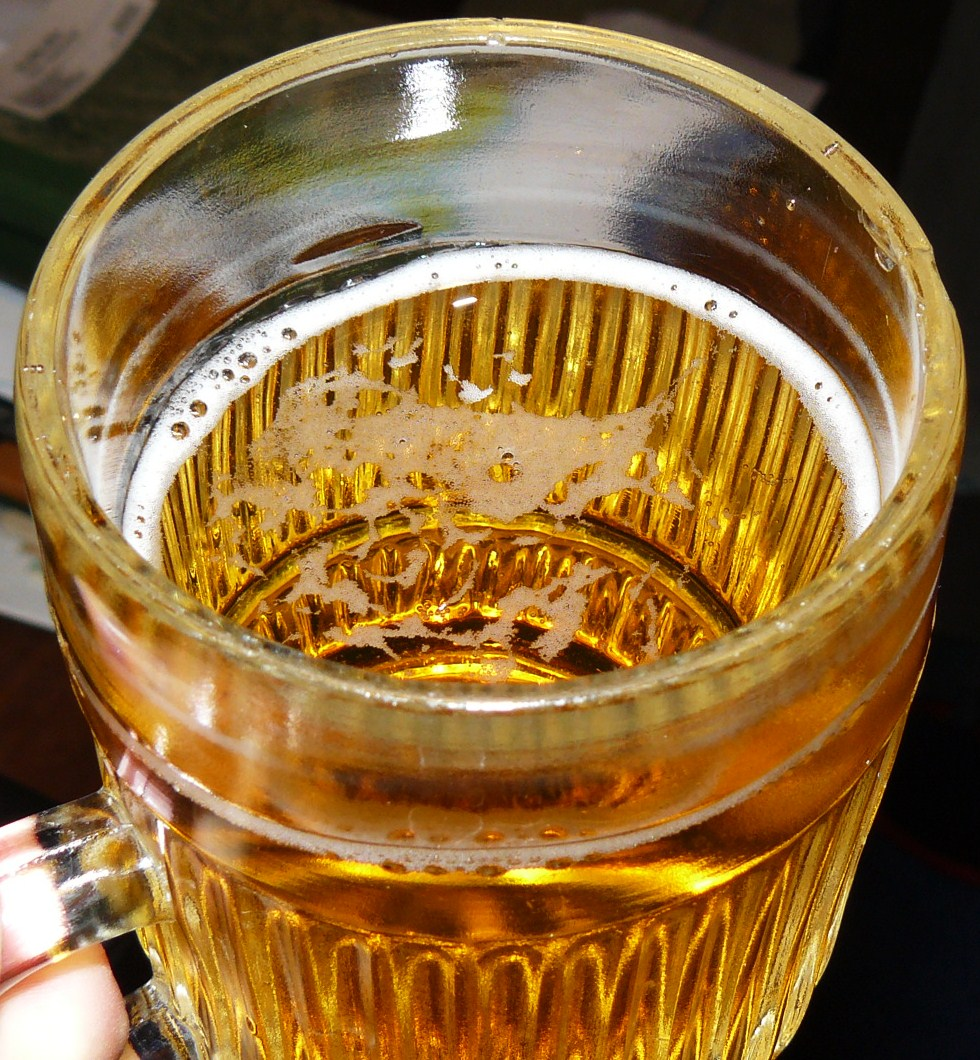
Typical polish lager, called Piwo jasne lekkie

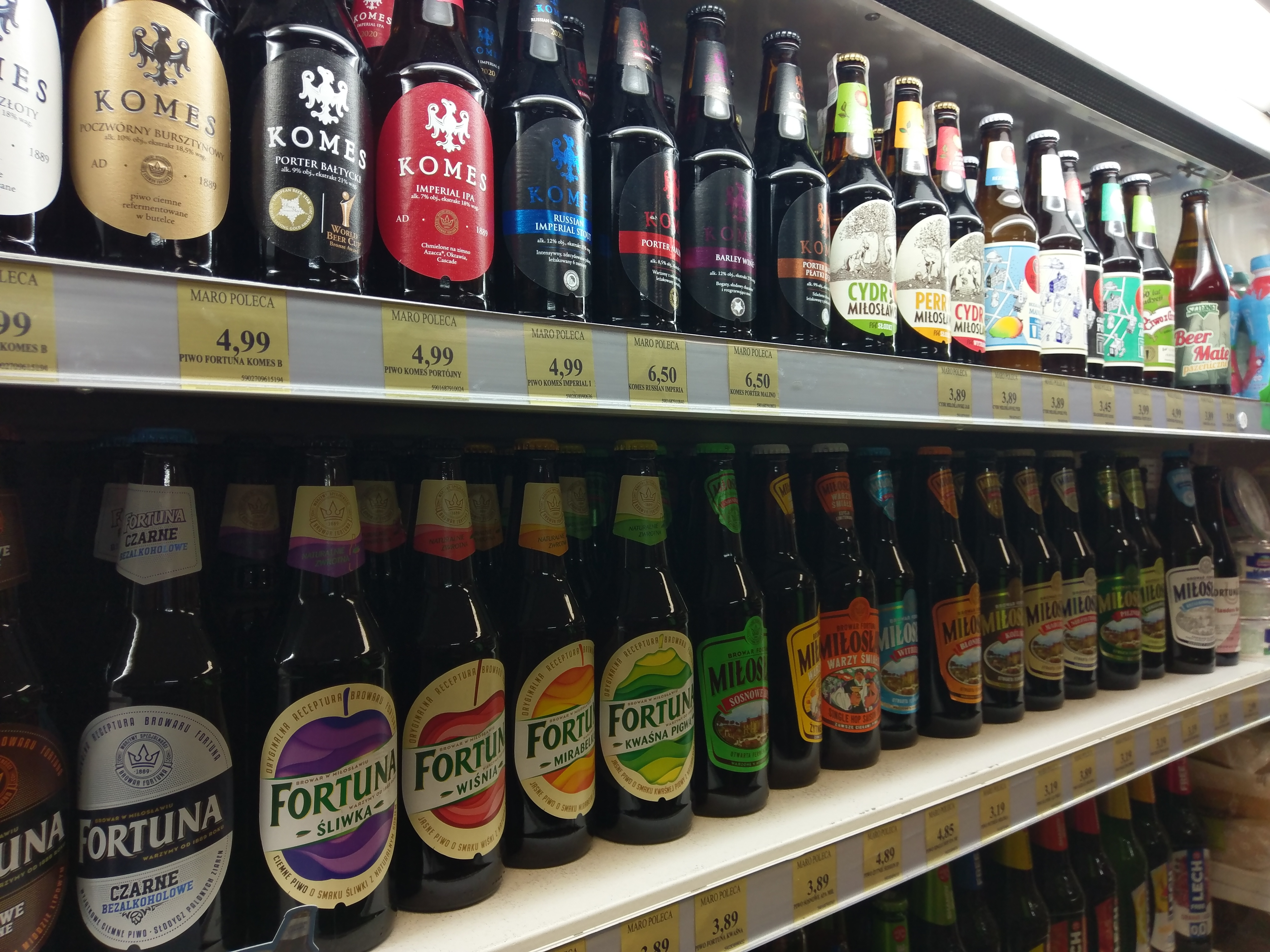
Various Polish beers on a supermarket shelf

Beer has been brewed in Poland for well over a thousand years and has a significant history of traditional and commercial beer production. In 2009, Poland was Europe's third largest beer producer, producing 36.9 million hectolitres, coming after the United Kingdom with 49.5 million hl and neighbouring Germany with 103 million hl.

Following the Second World War, most breweries were nationalised by the Polish United Workers' Party regime of the Polish People's Republic. After the Revolution of 1989 and the shock therapy of extensive privatisation, the market economy returned, international beer companies moved in and a period of consolidation followed. Three companies now control 80% of the Polish beer market (according to data at the end of 2014). At the end of 2013, there were 97 breweries in Poland, including microbreweries and contracted breweries.

Beer from small regional breweries, grouped in the Association of Polish Regional Breweries (Stowarzyszenie Regionalnych Browarów Polskich), crafts, contracted breweries and brewpubs has become popular and desired by consumers.

== Industry ==
According to a 2009 Ernst & Young report, Poland is Europe's third largest beer producer. Poland produces 36.9 million hectolitres, coming after the UK with 49.5 million hl and Germany with 103 million hl.

Following consecutive growth in the home market, Związek Pracodawców Przemysłu Piwowarskiego (the Union of the Brewing Industry Employers in Poland), which represents approximately 90% of the Polish beer market, announced during its annual brewing industry conference that consumption of beer in 2008 rose to 94 litres per capita, or 35,624 million hectolitres sold on the domestic market. Statistically, a Polish consumer drinks some 92 litres of beer a year, which places it third behind the Czech Republic and Germany.

In 2009, beer sales paid some PLN 3.097 bn in excise taxes to the Polish government. Total employment due to beer production and sales is 207,900.

== Brands and varieties ==
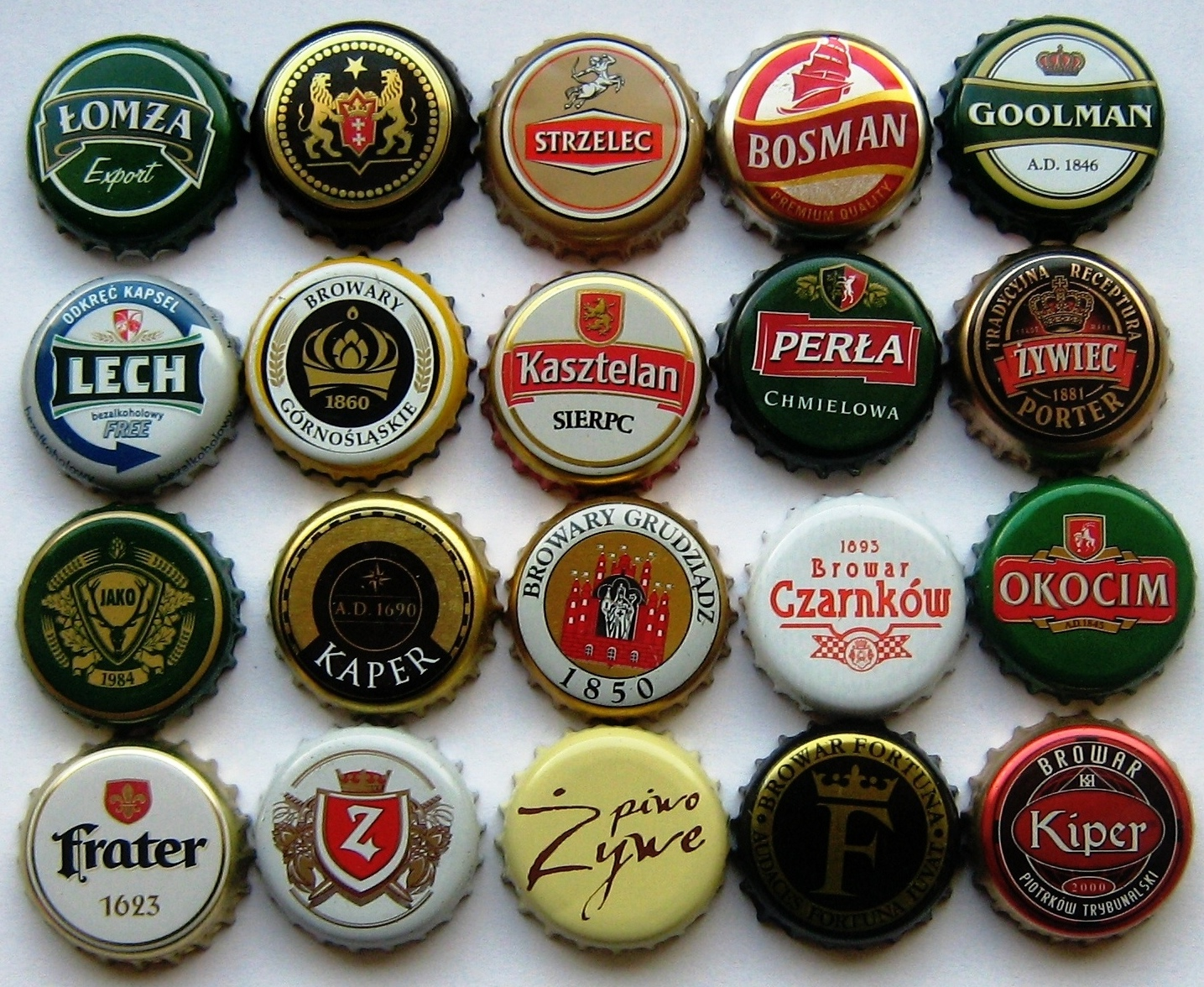
Bottle caps of Polish beers

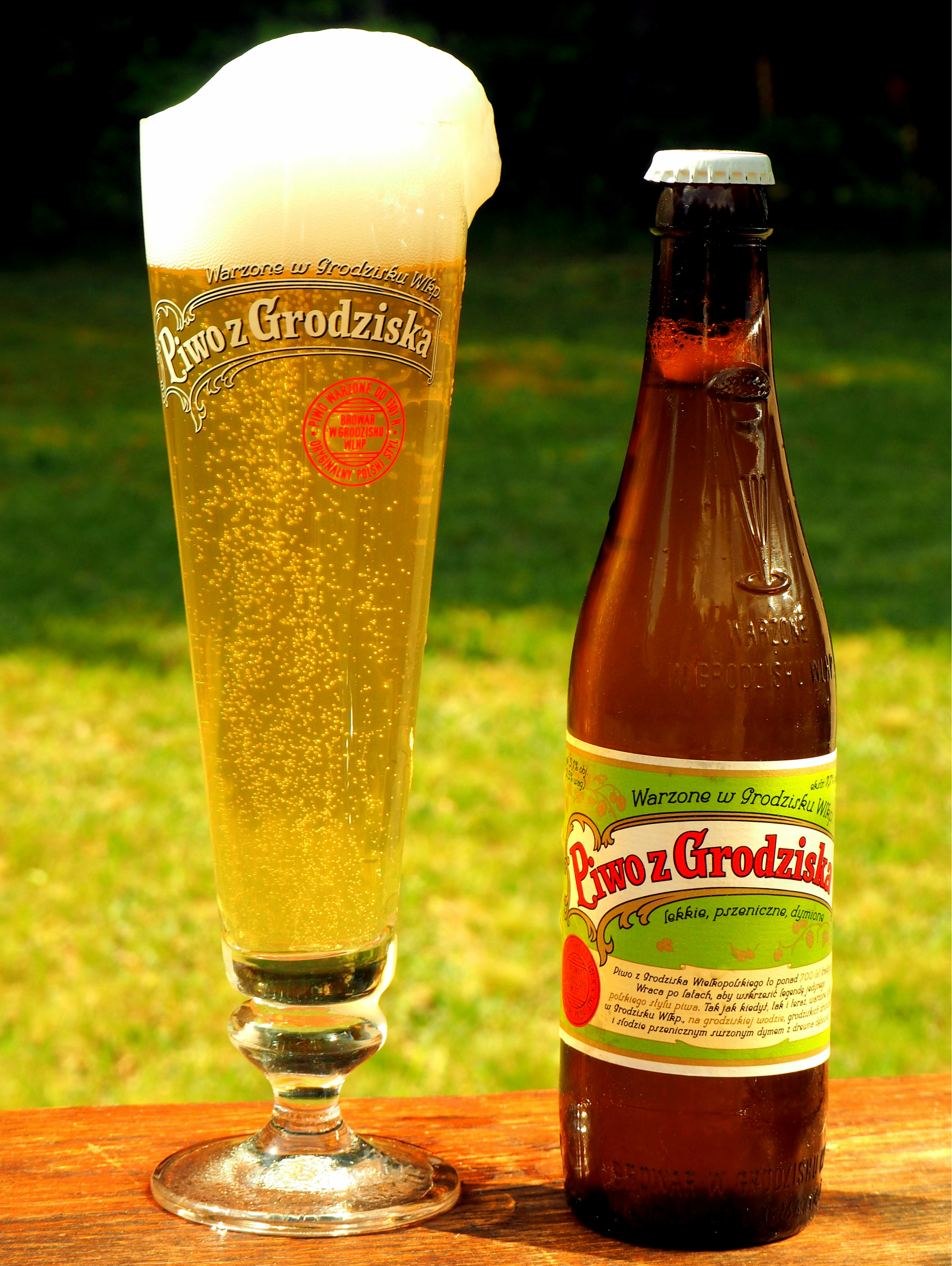
Grodziskie

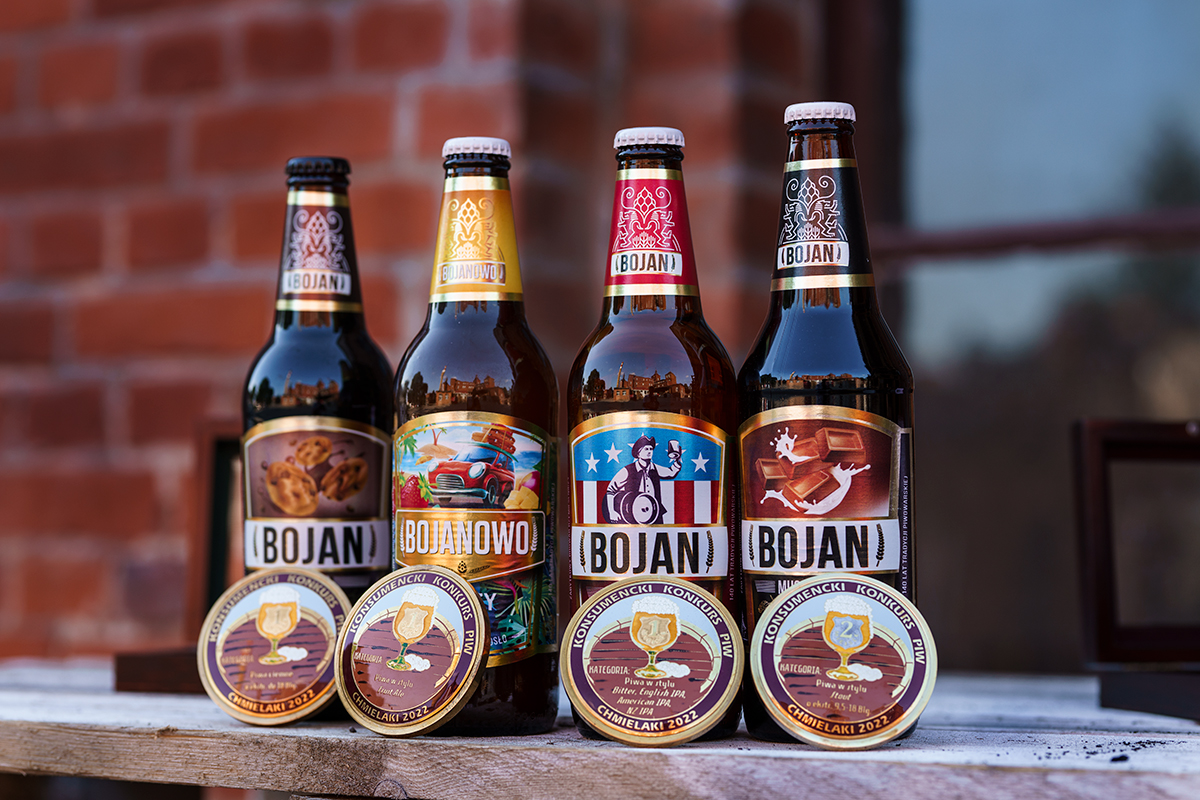
Beers from Bojanowo Brewery were awarded many times for its perfect quality and taste, including World Beer Awards

Poland is well known for its beer culture and many varieties. Large breweries are majority owned by multinational companies. However, since 2011, craft beer has become more and more popular each year. Many multitap serving only craft beer and dedicated shops have opened since 2012. Craft brewers brew beer in many different styles. In 2014, Polish craft breweries brewed about 500 new brands of beer. In 2017 the number of breweries in Poland exceeded 200.

- Kompania Piwowarska (market share in 2014 - 33%)

It is majority owned by Asahi Breweries. It operates three breweries in Poland:

1. Tychy Brewery
2. Lech Brewery Wielkopolski
3. Dojlidy Brewery
- Grupa Żywiec S.A. (market share in 2014 - 27%)

Żywiec is 61% owned by Heineken Group. It operates six breweries in Poland:

1. Żywiec Brewery is one of the most well known brands. It has three varieties: Żywiec, Żywiec Bock, Żywiec Porter.
2. Elbrewery brews Specjal Jasny Pełny, Hevelius Kaper. The "EB" brand is available for export only.
3. Leżajsk Brewery brews Leżajsk Pełne, Tatra Jasne Pełne and Tatra Mocne.
4. Warka Brewery brews Warka, Warka Strong, and Królewskie.
5. Cieszyn Brewery brews Double IPA, Żywiec Porter, Porter Cieszyński, Brackie, Brackie Mastne.
6. Browar Namysłów brews about 1.7 million hl of beer per year and runs two breweries in Namysłów and Braniewo and under the brands Namyslów, Braniewo, Zamkowe and Kuflowe.
- Carlsberg Polska (market share in 2014 - 20,5%)
1. Okocim Brewery brews Carlsberg, O.K. Beer, Harnaś, Piast, Książ and Karmi.
2. Kasztelan Brewery brews Kasztelan Jasne Pełne, Kasztelan Mocne and Kasztelan Niepasteryzowane.
3. Bosman Brewery brews Bosman Full and Bosman Specjal.
- Browary Regionalne Jakubiak
1. Ciechan Brewery
2. Lwówek Brewery
3. Bojanowo Brewery
4. Tenczynek Brewery
5. Biskupiec Brewery
- Van Pur
1. Van Pur Brewery in Rakszawa brews Van Pur and Karpackie
2. BROK Brewery in Koszalin BROK
3. Łomża Brewery in Łomża brews Łomża
4. Jędrzejów Brewery which brews Strzelec (Sagittarius)
5. Upper Silesia Brewery in Zabrze brews Śląskie
- Perła - Browary Lubelskie
1. Browary Lubelskie in Lublin brews Perła and Goolman
2. Zwierzyniec Brewery

== Images of selected breweries ==
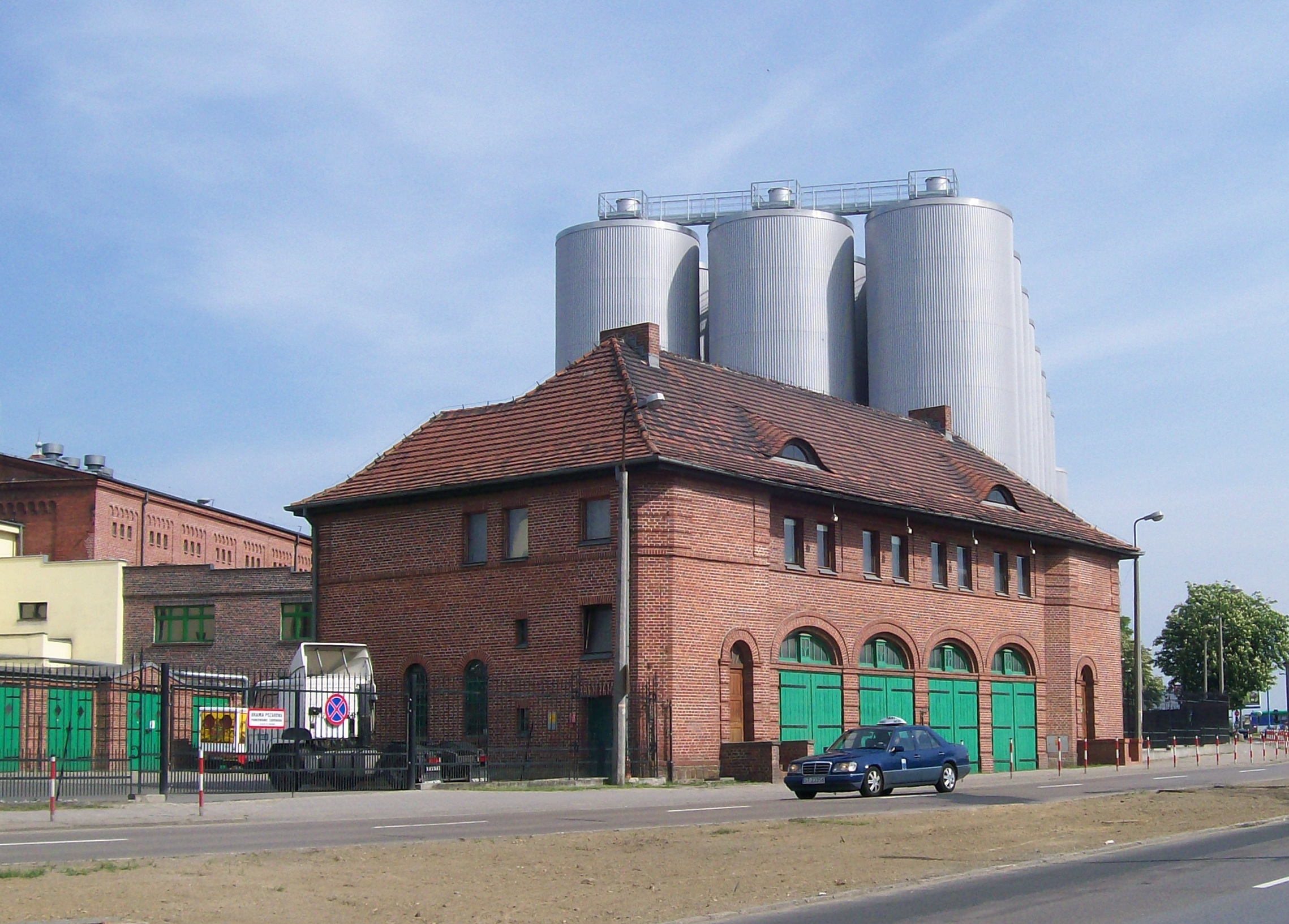
Browar Tyskie

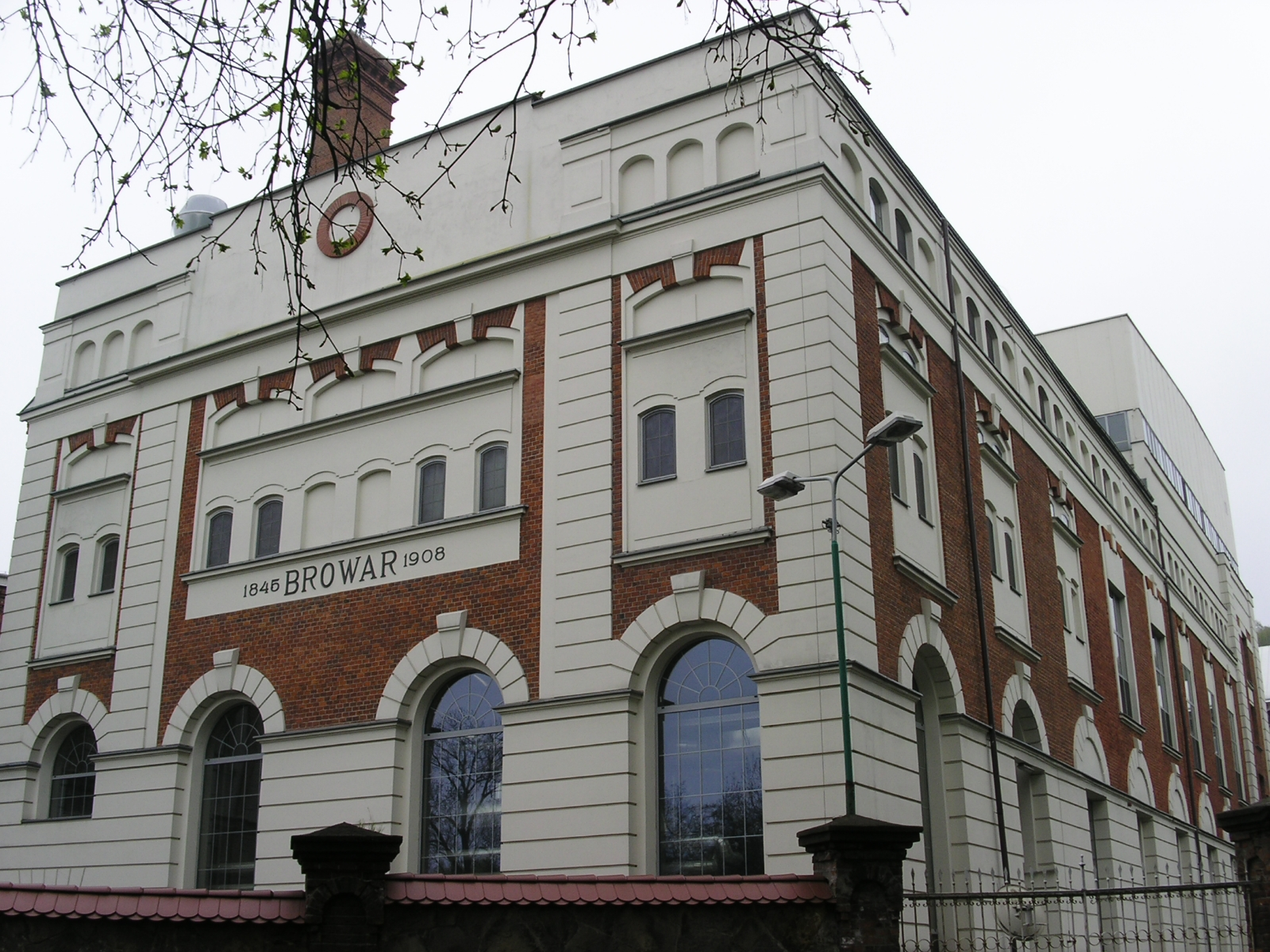
Okocim Brewery

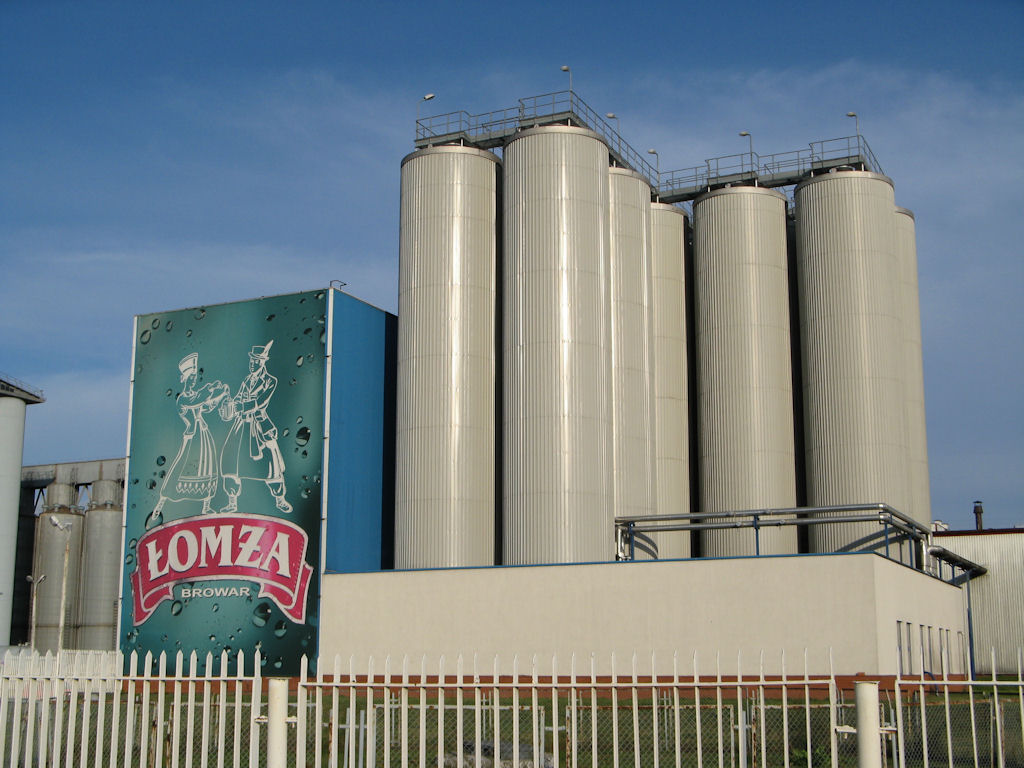
Browar Łomża

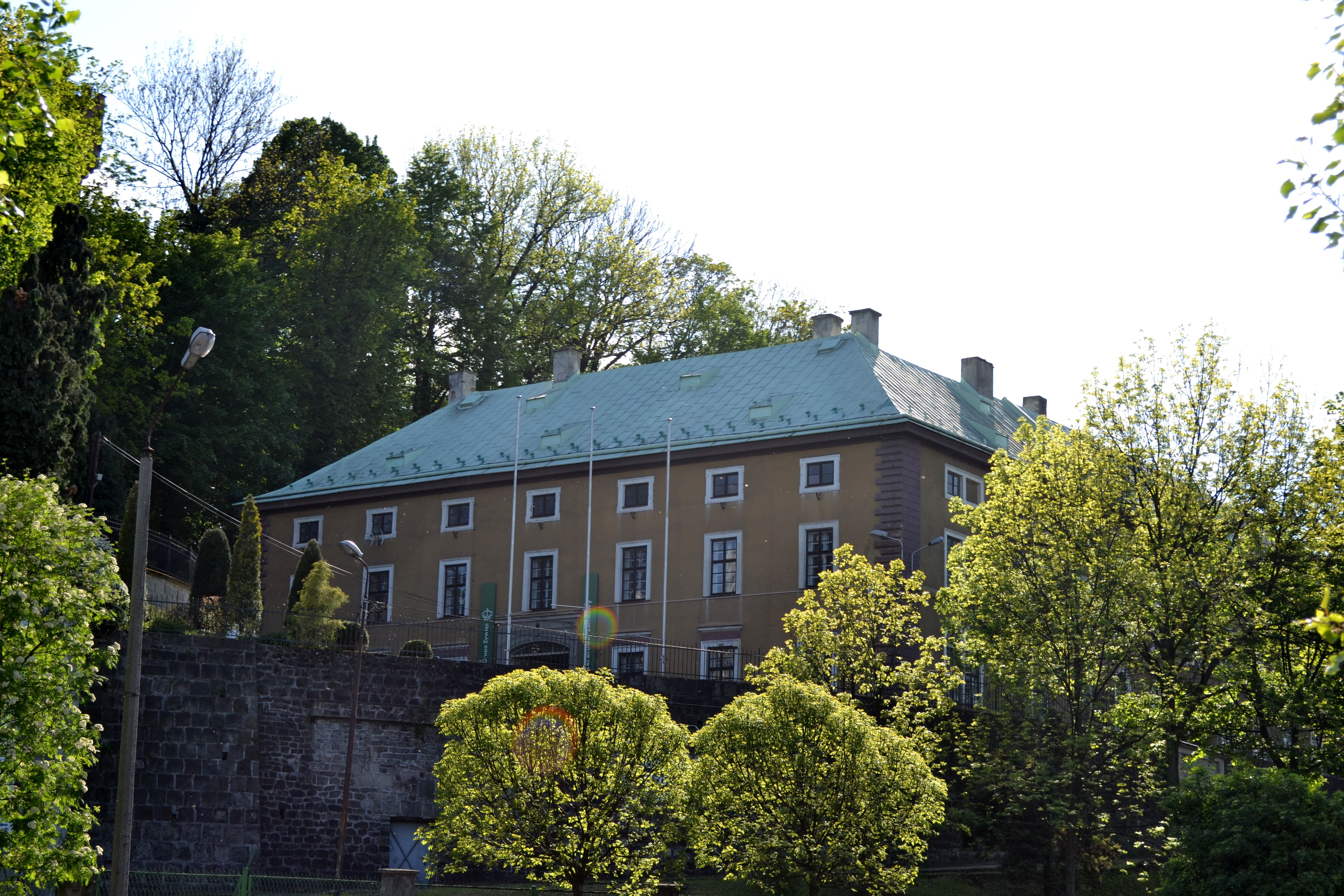
Cieszyn Brewery

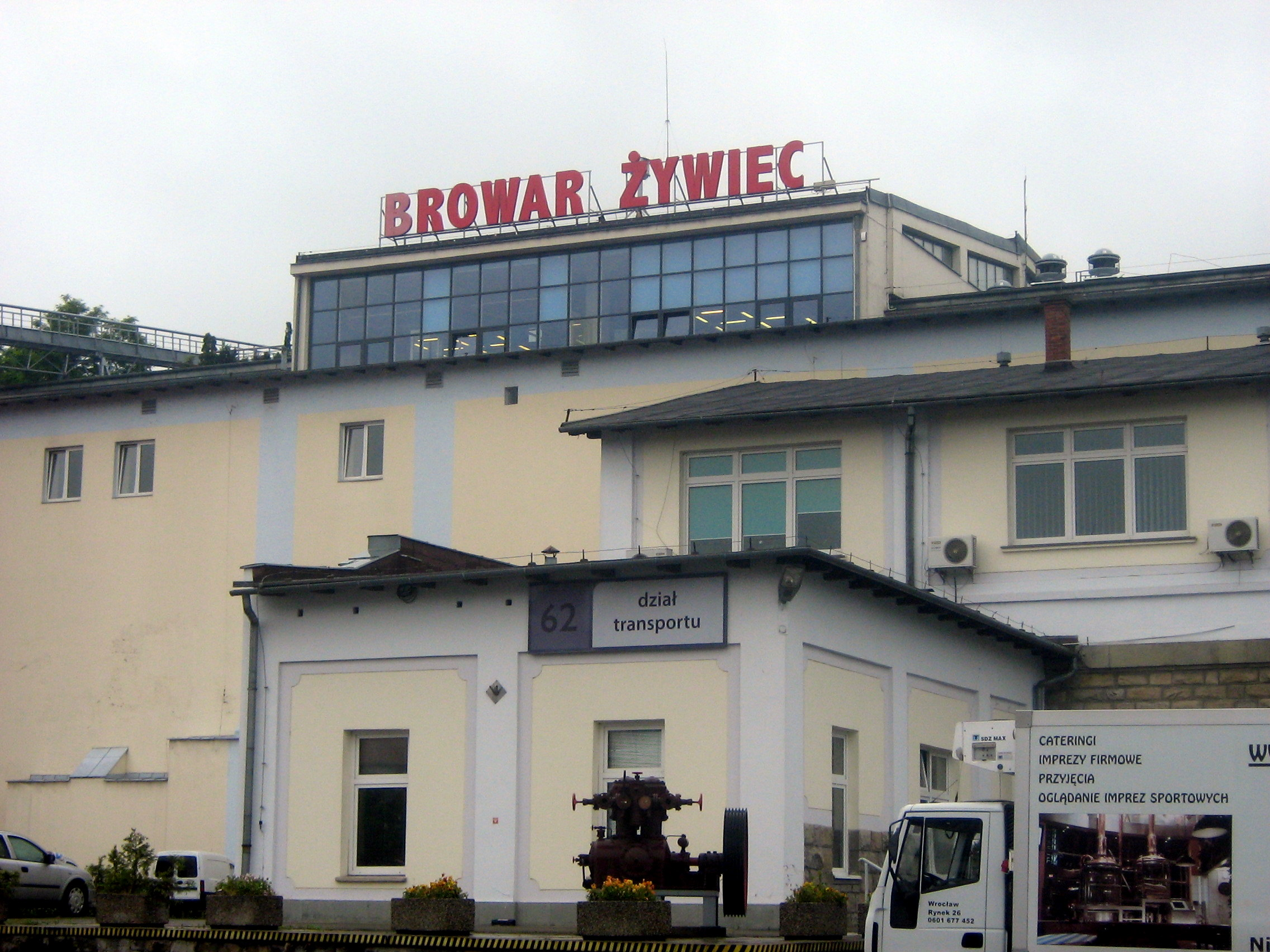
Browar Żywiec

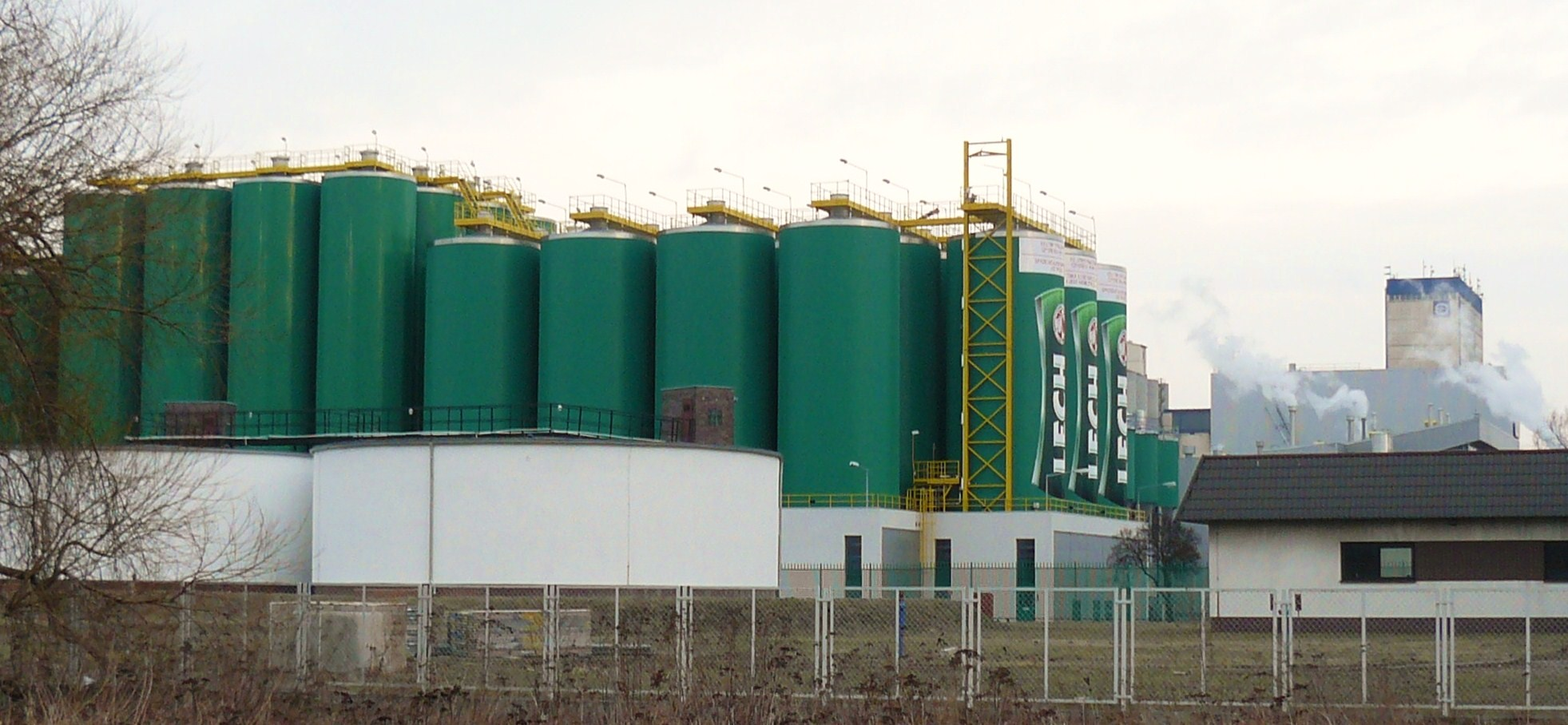
Browar Lech

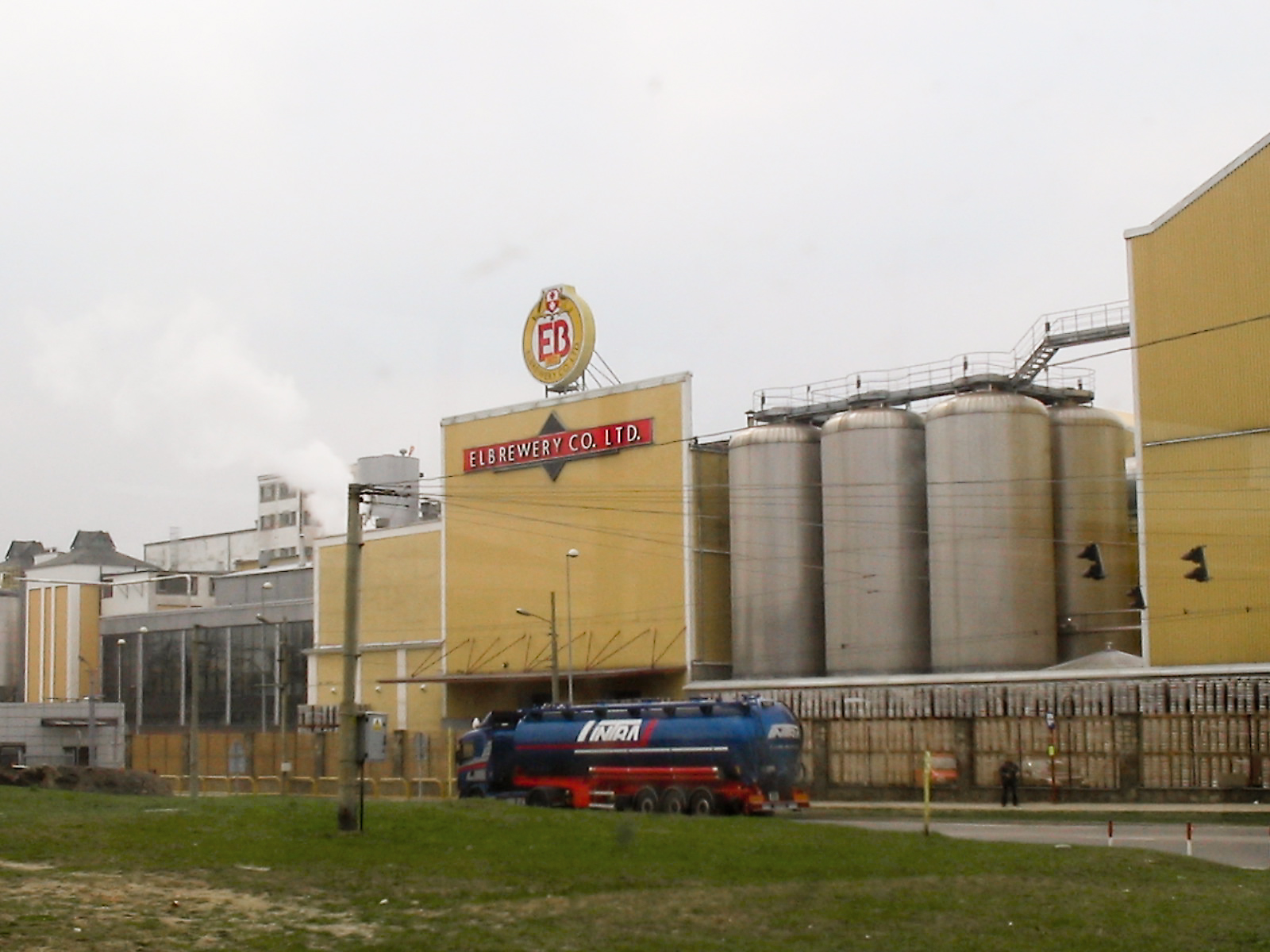
Elbrewery

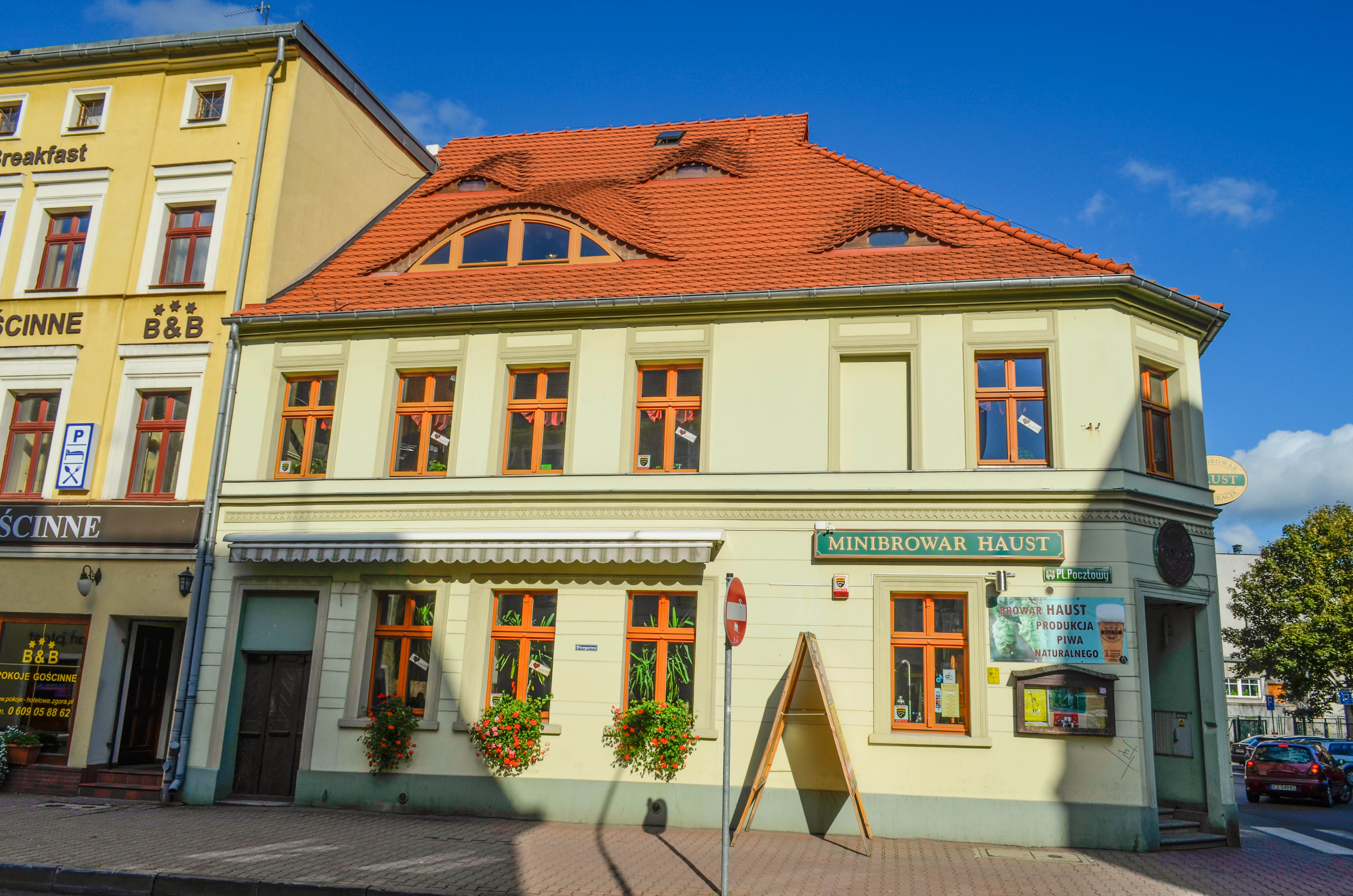
Browar Haust in Zielona Góra

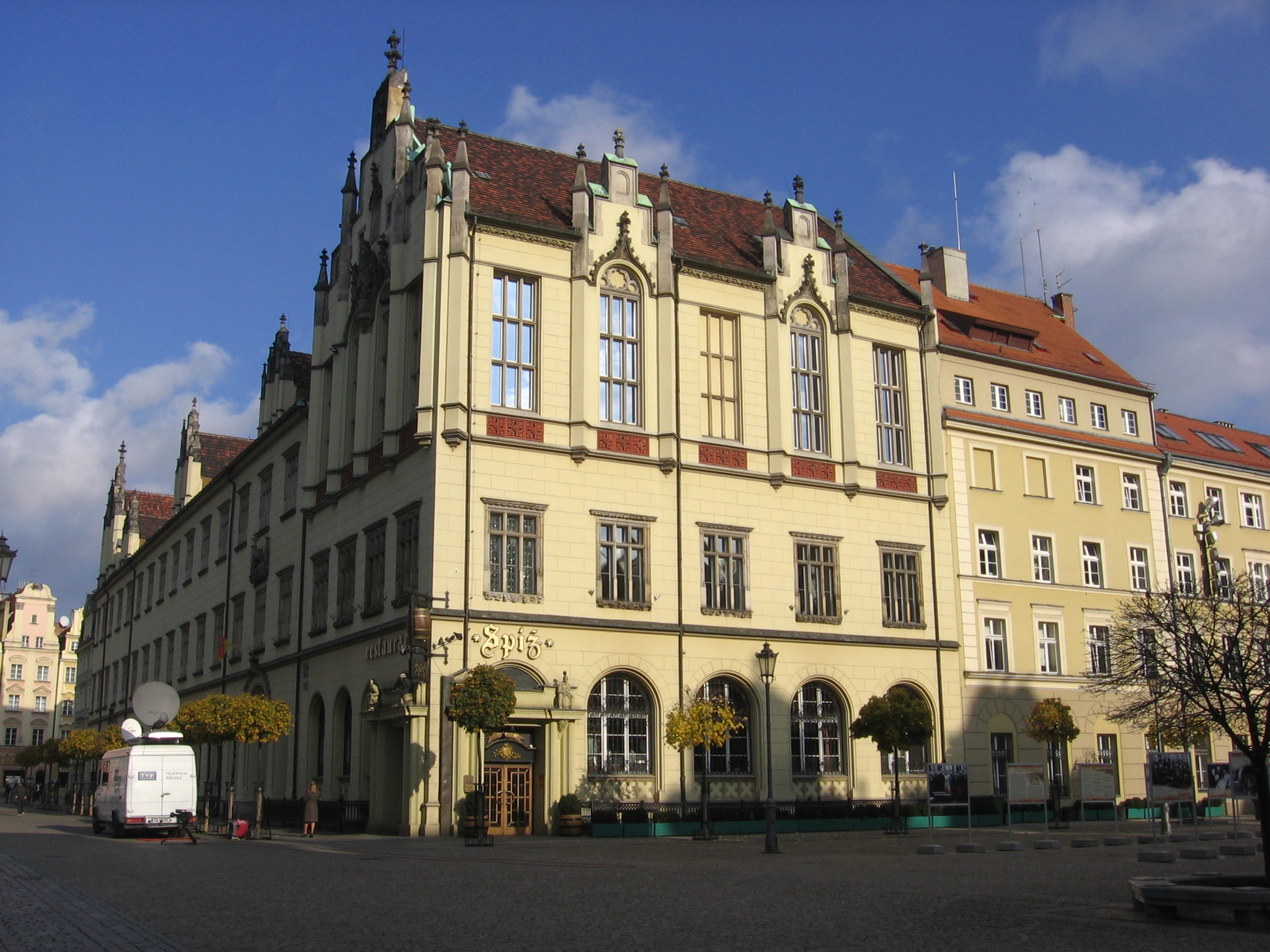
Brewpub Spiż in Wrocław

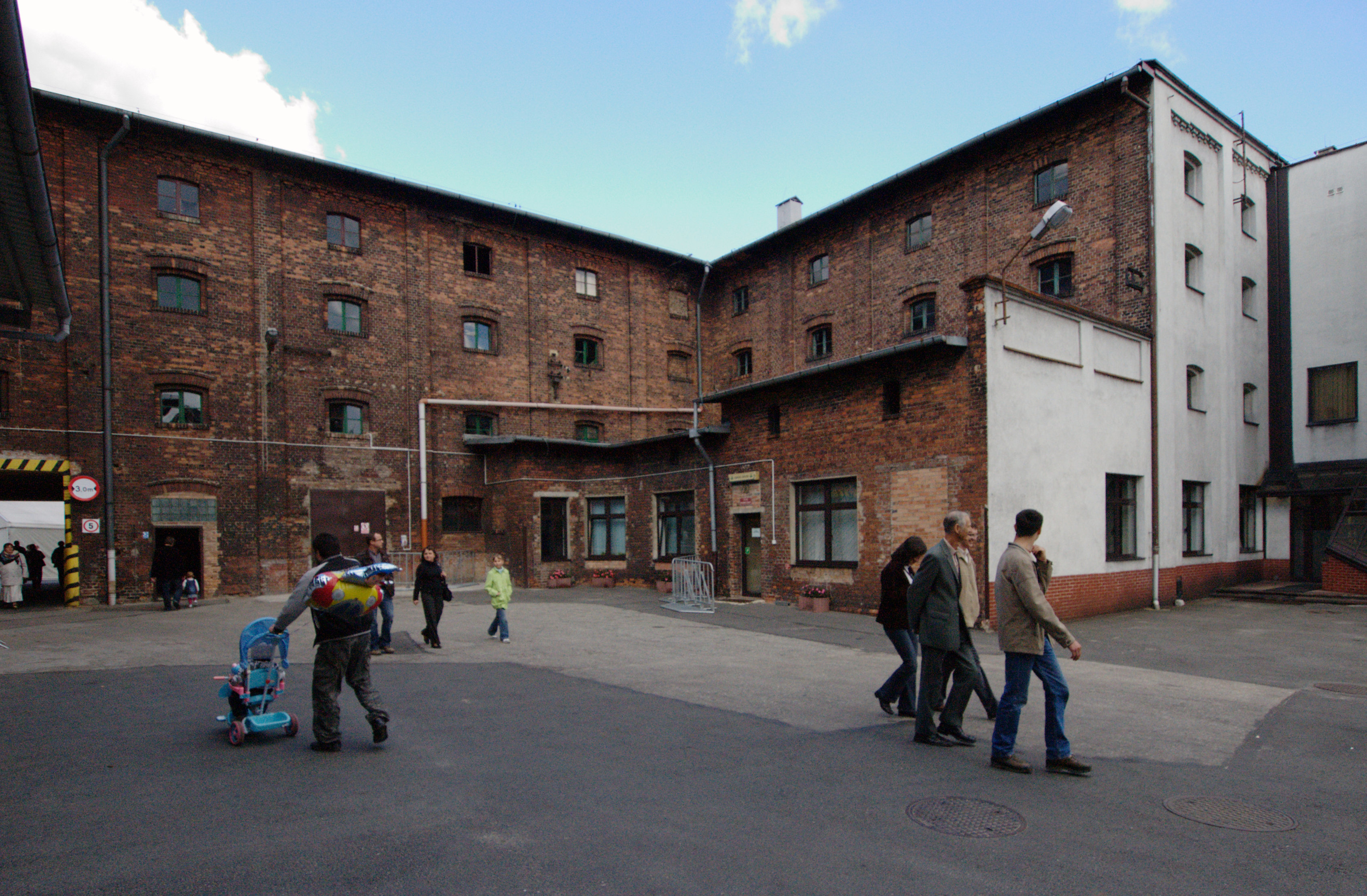
Upper Silesia Brewery

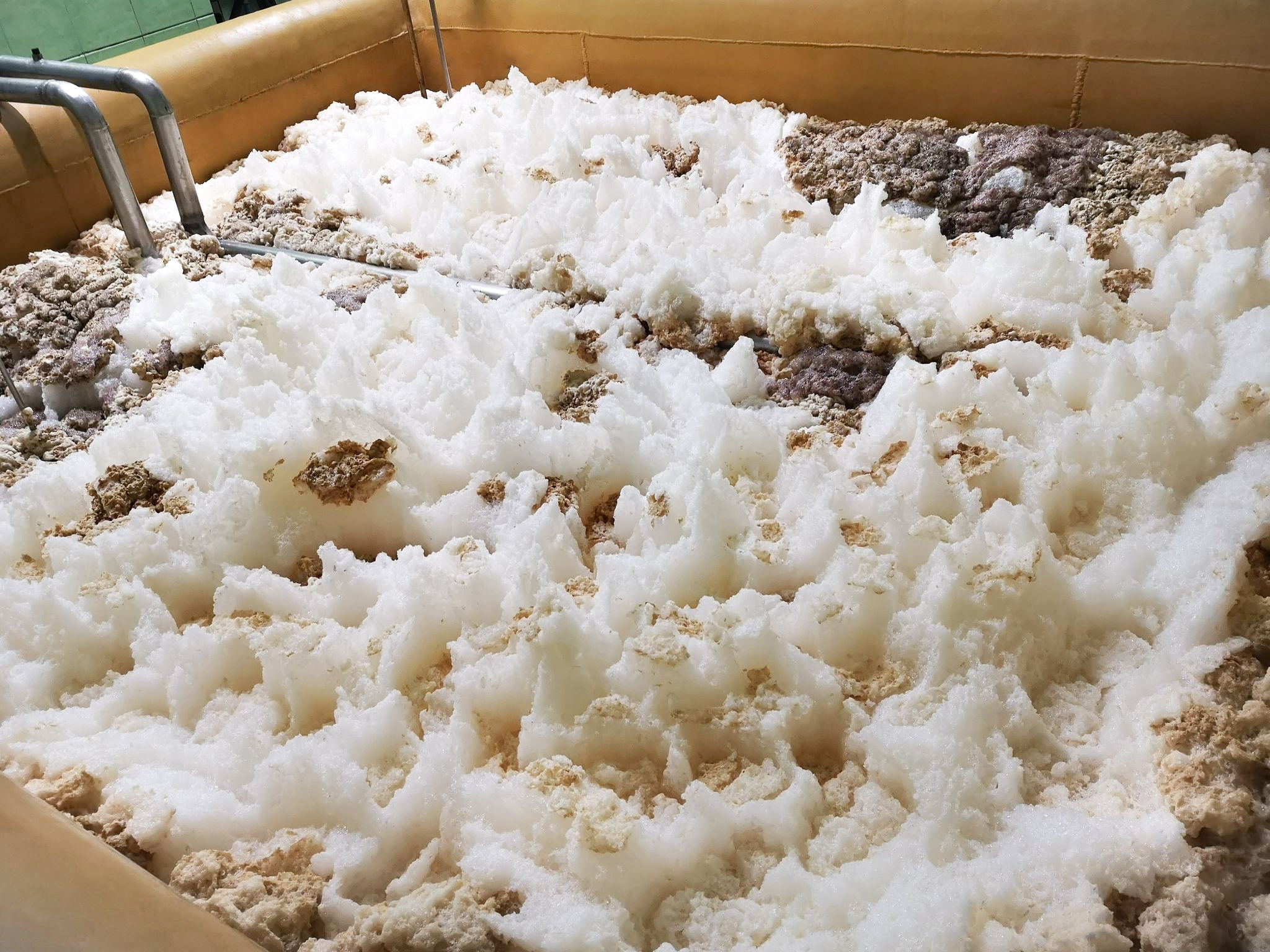
Traditional open vat fermentation in historical Bojanowo Brewery

== Popular beer types ==
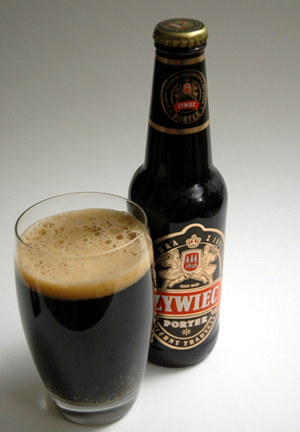
A glass of Baltic porter

- Euro lagers of light, full and high strength. Called 'Piwo jasne lekkie', 'Piwo jasne pełne', 'Piwo jasne mocne'. ABV 3-9% depending on type, these most common beers found in Poland especially from 5%-6% ABV.
- Pilsner.
- Baltic porters, classic style originating from countries surrounding the Baltic Sea, having its roots in porter and stout. Called 'Porter' or 'Piwo ciemne mocne'. Usually of high strength of around 8-10% ABV. Commercial example: Komes Porter Bałtycki, Ciechan Porter, Lwówek Porter, Porter Warmiński, Grand Imperial Porter, Porter Cieszyński, Żywiec Porter, Okocim Porter, Perła Porter, and many others.
- Amber lager styles - Vienna, Marzen, etc.
- Bock styles, mainly Doppelbock. Known as 'Koźlak' as well as 'Bock' in Poland. Commercial examples: Amber Koźlak.

== See also ==
- Beer and breweries by region
- Festival of Good Beer
- Grodziskie
- Mead in Poland
- Polish wine
