= Brewpole =

Brewpole B.V. is a defunct Brewery holding company that became part of Browary Zywiec S.A. It was a Dutch holding company for Polish breweries founded in March 1993. During the period from March 1993 through December 1997, Brewpole acquired controlling shareholdings in four leading Polish breweries: Elbrewery, Heveliusz, Warka and Lezajsk. The combined market share of the Brewpole Group in 1998 was 28%. Brands within the Brewpole Group included EB, Hevelius, Warka, Warka Strong, Lezajsk, Specjal, Gdanskie and Kaper.

In December 1998, the shareholders of Brewpole B.V. sold the company to Browary Zywiec S.A. in a reverse acquisition (as Zywiec had a market share of 12%) and Brewpole B.V. was liquidated 24 November 1999. The subsequent merger with Heineken was cleared by EU competition authorities.

== See also ==
- Polish beer
- Żywiec Brewery
- Elbrewery
