= Cieszyn Brewery =

Polish brewery

Coordinates: 49°45′07″N 18°37′34″E

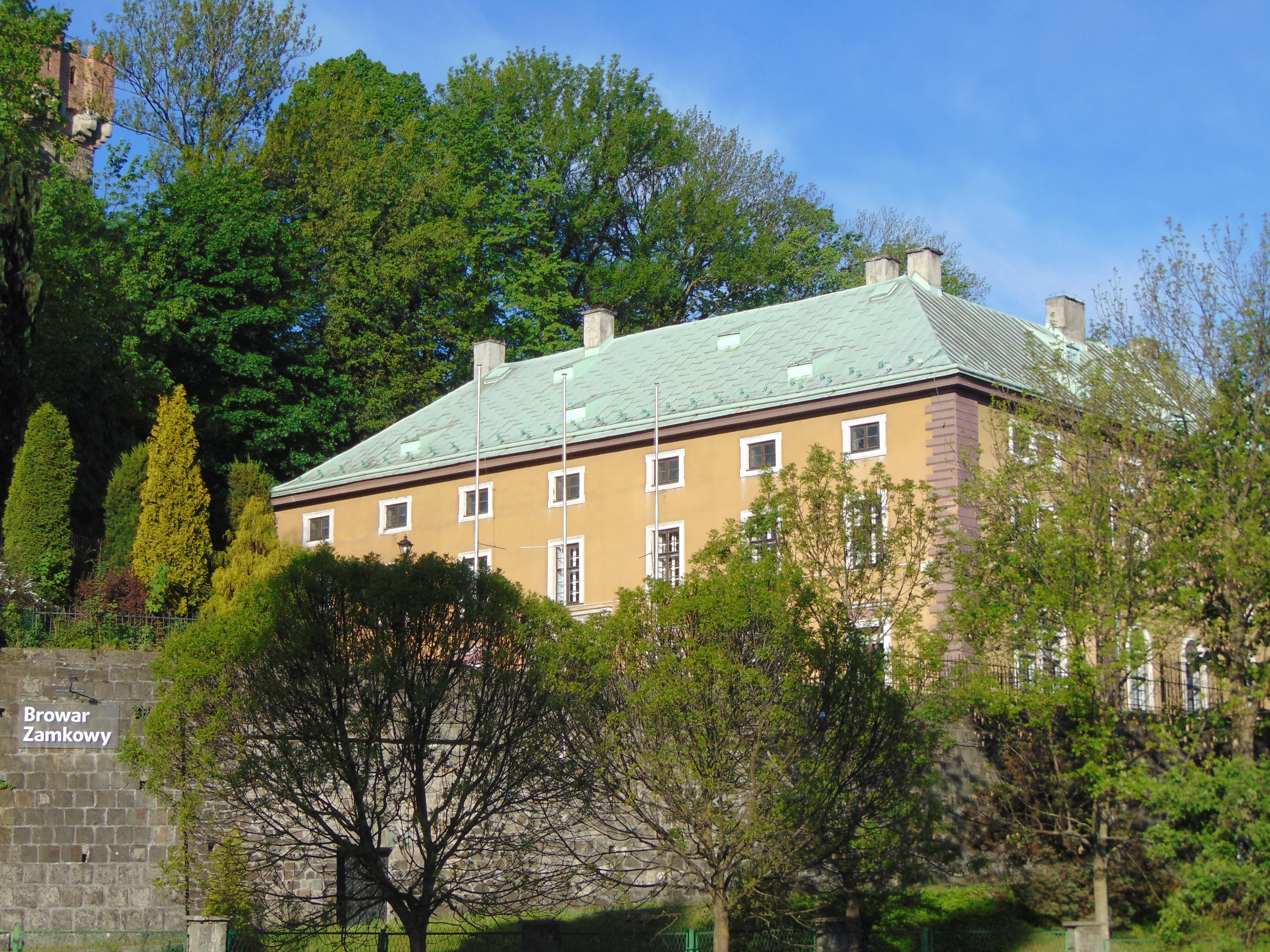
Cieszyn Brewery

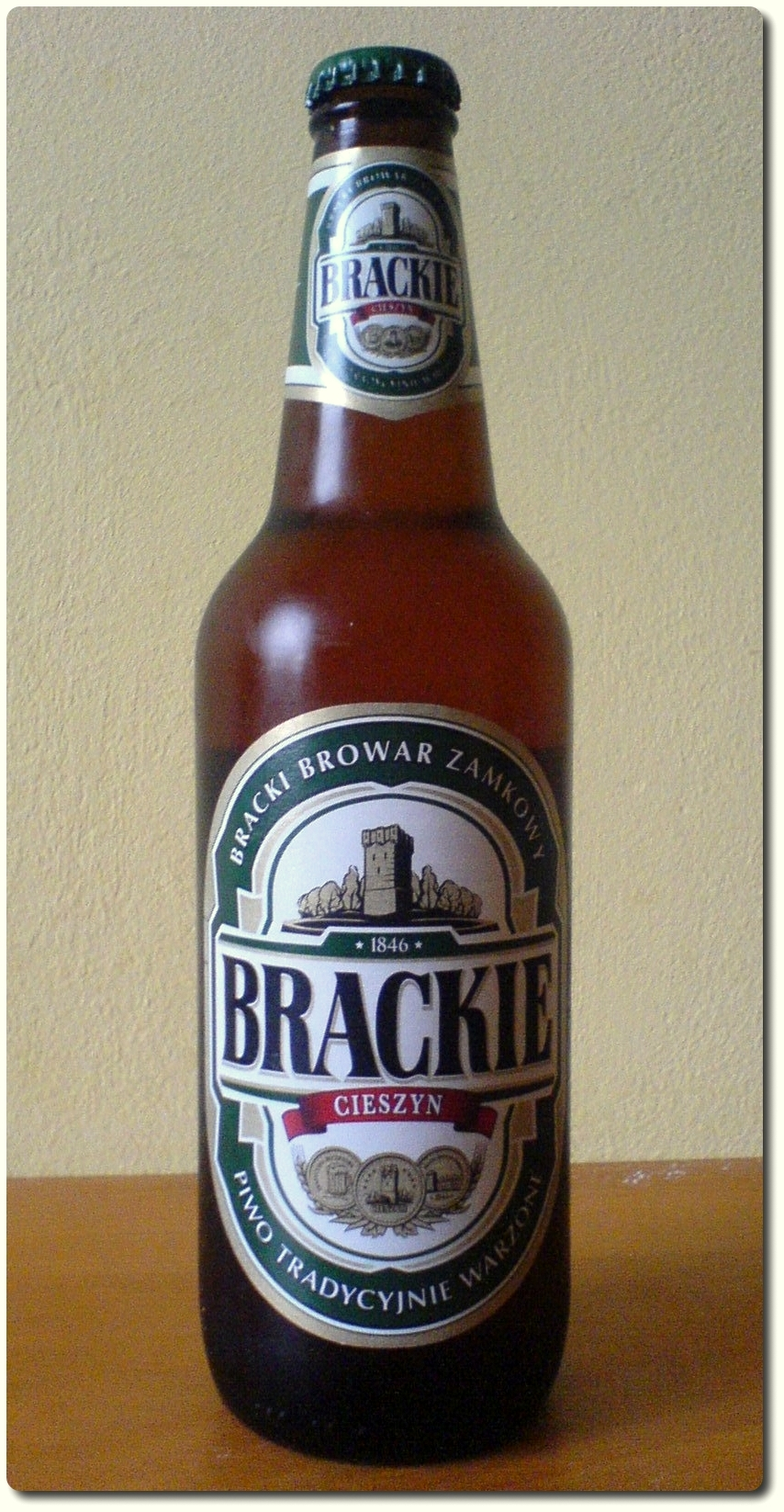
Brackie Beer

The Cieszyn Brewery is a historic brewery in Poland and belongs to the Felix Investments. It is the longest continuously operating brewery in Poland. The brewery is located in the border town of Cieszyn, on the Castle Hill in the Classicist palace.

== History ==
=== The brewery on the Castle Hill ===
The pre-beginnings of the Castle Brewery in Cieszyn date back to 1653, when Emperor Ferdinand III granted the Cieszyn Duchy to his son, Prince Ferdinand IV. In the same year, the prince's commissioner appointed Kasar Tłuk of Toszonowice as regent of the princely estates, which he created in the complex known as the Cieszyn Chamber. At the end of 1653, regent Tluk opened a brewery in the castle in Cieszyn. He did it unlawfully, as he broke the mileage privilege belonging to the city of Cieszyn. Due to strong protests of the townspeople, the regent temporarily interrupted the production of beer, but after some time he resumed it again, this time delivering beer only outside the area of one mile reserved for the city.

=== Habsburg Brewery ===
In 1838, Archduke Karol Ludwik Habsburg decided to thoroughly rebuild his residence in Cieszyn. To this end, he brought in the Viennese architect Joseph Kornhäusl, who had the ruins of the Piast castle demolished, with the exception of the tower and the Romanesque rotunda. Soon a new, classicist palace with an orangery and an English-style park was built on Góra Zamkowa. As if on the occasion of this great reconstruction, encouraged by the successes of Pilsner-type beer on the market at that time, the Cieszyn prince Karol Ludwik decided to build his own brewery in Cieszyn.

Cieszyn had a long brewing tradition, as there was a burgher brewery here from the 15th century. However, it was not owned by the prince, and moreover, it produced only traditional top-fermented beer in small quantities. Therefore, around 1840, just below the castle, on the slope of the hill, the construction of a modern brewery was started, which was to deal with the production of Pilsen-type beer on an industrial scale. Construction was completed in 1846 and the plant began operating almost immediately after its opening.

Beer from Cieszyn quickly became popular not only in the Duchy of Cieszyn, but throughout the Habsburg monarchy. The son and successor of Karol Ludwik, Archduke Albrecht Frederick Habsburg, delighted with the successes of the plant, developed production and in 1856 decided to establish another brewery, which was built on his order in the village of Pawlus near Żywiec. The first brewers of the Żywiec brewery came from Cieszyn.

Before World War I, the brewery was connected with the Wine and Liqueur Factory in Błogocice.

=== State brewery ===
After the end of World War I and the fall of Austria-Hungary, the property of the Cieszyn dukes was nationalized. In 1920, the brewery was nationalized and the Państwowe Zamkowe Zakłady Przemysłowe in Cieszyn was established. In the 1920s, it was leased to Warsaw entrepreneurs related to, inter alia, with President Ignacy Mościcki. In 1933, the plant came under the management of the State Forests Directorate.

During World War II, the brewery was not closed down and production continued. After 1945, it was incorporated into the Bielskie Zakłady Piwowarsko-Słodniczych, and then the Beer Factory in Żywiec. All this time, still in the same building, the brewery produced various types of beer, including its flagship product – light beer of the Pilsen type.

=== Grupa Żywiec brewery ===
At the beginning of the 1990s, the Cieszyn brewery was privatized and purchased together with the Żywiec brewery by the Dutch company Heineken. Production was limited to one type of beer, which was given the commercial name of Żywiec Brackie. Beers from Cieszyn were sold all over the country at that time.

After a few years, it was decided to change the nature of the plant to a regional producer, therefore the commercial name of the Żywiec Brackie brand was abandoned and the name Brackie was introduced. The graphic design was also significantly changed and the distribution of beer began with a focus on the local market of the Silesian Voivodeship. In 2003, the production of the nationwide brand – Żywiec Porter was started in the brewery in Cieszyn, but it is distributed on the Polish market under the logo of Żywiec Brewery.

Since 2009, the Bracki Browar Zamkowy in Cieszyn has been producing one-off drums of special beers for Grupa Żywiec. In 2009, the Bracki Koźlak Dubeltowy beer was brewed here, the recipe of which is the home brewer, Jan Krysiak, winner of the 7th Home Brewers Competition in Żywiec. In 2010, the winner of the 8th Home Brewers Competition in Żywiec, Dorota Chrapek, brewed a Belgian pale ale in a Cieszyn brewery, but - Brackie Pale Belgijskie Ale. In 2011, it produced Grupa Żywiec beer for the stores of the Biedronka - Leżajsk Pszeniczne chain. In the same year, Grand Champion Birofilia 2011 was created in this brewery – cologne, according to the recipe of Jan Szała.

In 2010, the brewery started producing amber ale, Brackie Mastne. It also became the seat of the Polish Association of Home Brewers. Moreover, a project was implemented to transform the plant into a living museum of brewing.

In 2011, the brewery was formally consolidated with Grupa Żywiec.

=== Cieszyn Castle Brewery ===
In 2015, the castle brewery in Cieszyn gained greater autonomy and became an independent, separate organizational unit. It was still part of the Żywiec capital group, but had its own, independent structure and visual identification called Browar Zamkowy Cieszyn.

On December 23, 2020, Felix Investments purchased 100% of the brewery's shares from Grupa Żywiec.

== Architecture ==
The Castle Brewery was erected at the request of Archduke Charles Ludwik and the foundation stone was laid by Archduke Albrecht Frederick. It was built according to the plans of the Viennese architect Józef Kornhäusl, and the construction was supervised by Frederick Baldauf, a master bricklayer brought from Vienna. The "heart" of the brewery is a four-wing, three-story rectangular building with a central courtyard. The building gained a defensive character due to the fact that its corners and gate were decorated with pseudorustic.

The historical layout of the brewery's buildings and rooms was divided according to their function.

The main building is connected with the sun loungers which are part of the complex of underground corridors. They were situated on different levels of the castle hill. The object adjacent to the brewery building in the south-west part is a high cellar - an ice tunnel, which was drilled under the castle hill, almost to the middle of the courtyard of the medieval upper castle. Ice was stored there, which was used in the production process.

The malt house, built of brick and stone, with cellars for soaking and malting barley, was located in the basement of the brewery. Barley and malt warehouses, rooms for grain cleaning before malting and the so-called air drying rooms were located on the floors and attics.

An autonomous brewery, it takes up a small space, although it managed to accommodate: a mash tun, a filter tub, an auxiliary tub with a separating battery and a deburring device, an auxiliary boiler with a mixer, a kettle for cooking beer with a hopper and pumps.

The fermentation room was located on the first level of the cellars. There were cylindrical and conical open fermentation vats intended for bottom fermentation.

With time, until the First World War, the brewery building was expanded and rebuilt. Currently, it is a complex of buildings in various architectural styles, from Biedermeier to Neo-Gothic.

== Beer brands and types ==
- Mastne – polskie ALE (Amber Polish ALE)
- Lager / Lager Cieszyński (Pale Lager)
- Ciemna Strona Cieszyna (Munich Dark)
- Double IPA
- Sour Mango Ale (Sour Ale)
- Pszeniczne / Pszeniczne Cieszyńskie (Weizen / Weissbier)
- Witbier
- Fruit Wheat (Strawberry)
- West Coast IPA / Cieszyńskie West Coast IPA
- Porter / Porter Cieszyński (Baltic Porter)
- Stout / Stout Cieszyński
- Koźlak great snipe / Cieszyński Koźlak Double
- Lager BIO / Lager BIO Cieszyński (Pale Lager)
- Zdrój Zamkowy (Pale Lager)
- Noszak (Lager)
- UfF0% Pomegranate (soft drink)
- Hop na Kawkę (Brown Porter with coffee)
- Rye Wine / Rye Wine Cieszyński
- Wheat Wine / Wheat Wine Cieszyński
- Angielski Lord / Angielski Lord Cieszyński (Barley Wine)
- Guślarz Cieszyński (Gose)
- Juicy IPA / Juicy IPa Cieszyńskie (Juicy India Pale Ale)
- Czeska Desitka / Czeska Desitka Cieszyńska (Czech Desitka / Czech Desitka of Cieszyn)
- Lekka Brytania / Lekka Brytania Cieszyńska (Mild Ale)
- Brown Porter / Brown Porter Cieszyński (Brown Porter / English Porter)
- UfF0% Mango (soft drink)
- Quadrupel

== Logo ==
Brackie beer's logo is green and contains an image of the Brackie Browar castle.

== See also ==
- Polish beer
- Żywiec Brewery
- Elbrewery
- Warka Brewery
- Leżajsk Brewery
