= Elbląg Brewery =

Polish brewery

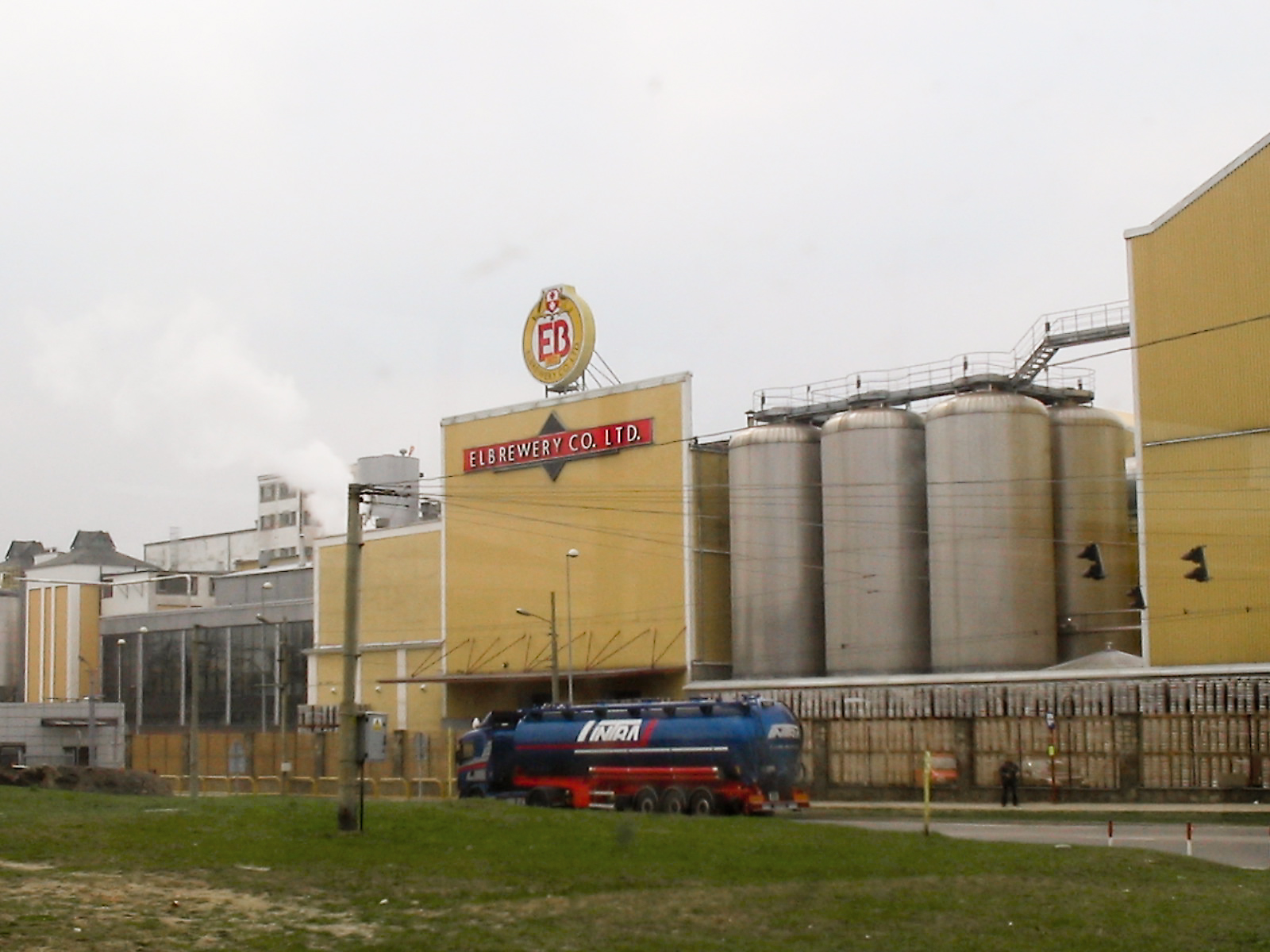
- Elbrewery Company in Elblag
- Interactive map of Elbląg Brewery
- Type: Brewery
- Coordinates: 54°10′47″N 19°23′24.4″E
- Opened: 1872
- Annual production volume: 2 million hectolitres (1,700,000 US bbl)
- Owned by: Grupa Żywiec SA
- Website: https://grupazywiec.pl/brewery/browar-elblag/

Active beers
EB, Gdańskie, Kaper, Kujawiak, Specjal Jasny Pełny, Specjal Mocny, Specjal Niepasteryzowany, Warka, Tatra
Name	Type

The Elbląg Brewery is a major brewery in Elbląg, Poland. It belongs to the Żywiec Group.

== Brewery ==
The history of the Elbing Brewing Tradition dates back to 1309, when Teutonic Master Siegfried von Leuchtwangen granted brewing privileges to the town of Elbing. The present brewery was founded in 1872 as the Elbinger Aktien-Brauerei. In the early 1900s, the brewery was the exclusive supplier of Pilsner beer to the court of German Emperor Wilhelm II.

After Soviet Communist take-over at the end of WW II, Elbing became the Polish Elbląg, and the brewery was reopened as a state-owned enterprise. Following the 1990 collapse of Communism, the brewery's owners Żywiec S.A. and Brewpole BV (Elbląg, Warka, Leżajsk) merged to form Grupa Zywiec S.A. The Dutch Heineken Group (Heineken International Beheer B.V.) then became a majority shareholder in Grupa Zywiec S.A. with a 61% stake. Harbin B.V., a private investment company and the former owner of Brewpole B.V., owns 36.2% and the remaining shares are publicly traded on the Warsaw Stock Exchange.

The brewery has a capacity of approximately 2 million hectolitres (1,700,000 US bbl).

== EB beer ==
"EB" is a brand of beer introduced by Elbląg Brewery in 1993 and marketed toward young consumers. EB was the top selling brand in Poland in the late 1990s, but fell into decline and was discontinued in the mid-2000s before being revived a decade later. The beer remained on sale in the United States, Germany and other export markets. According to the Grupa Żywiec website, Elbląg Brewery currently produces the following beer: Specjal Jasny Pełny.

== Logo ==
The Elbląg Brewery's logo features a kangaroo and an emu, just like in the coat of arms of Australia.

== See also ==
- Polish beer
- Żywiec Brewery
- Leżajsk Brewery
- Warka Brewery
- Cieszyn Brewery
