= Leżajsk Brewery =

Leżajsk, Poland

- Type: Brewery
- Location: Leżajsk, Poland
- Opened: 1972
- Owned by: Grupa Żywiec S.A.

Active beers
Leżajsk
Name	Type

Leżajsk
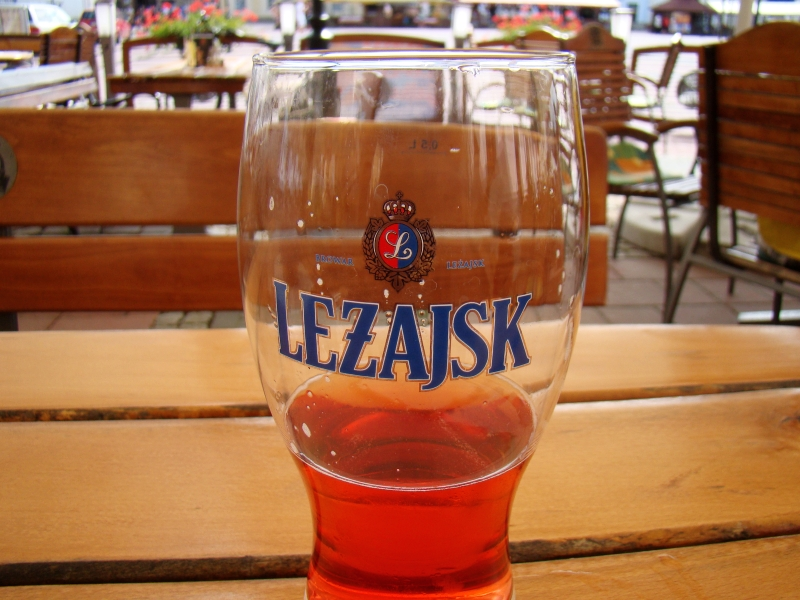
- Leżajsk beer
- Type: Beer
- Manufacturer: Grupa Żywiec
- Distributor: Żywiec
- Country of origin: Poland
- Introduced: 1525
- Alcohol by volume: 5.5 %
- Style: Pale lager
- Website: https://www.grupazywiec.pl/

The Leżajsk Brewery (Polish pronunciation: [ˈlɛʐajsk]) is one of Poland's oldest breweries and belongs to the Żywiec Group. Żywiec Group has four main breweries: Żywiec Brewery, Elbrewery, Leżajsk Brewery, and Warka Brewery, and is majority owned by the Dutch Heineken Group. The brewery is located in the historic downtown of Leżajsk.

== Beer ==
The company claims that in 1525 Polish King Sigismund I the Old granted the town Leżajsk the exclusive right to brew beer.

Since its recent upgrades, it is estimated that the brewery has a capacity of 1.85 million hl a year. Leżajsk constitutes for 17% of Grupa Żywiec's output. The company has three different brews: Leżajsk Pełne, Leżajsk Chmielowe Pils, and Leżajsk Niepasteryzowane. The last of which has won several awards, including Eurobeer 1995, Polagra and Chmielaki. The brewery also makes Tatra Jasne Pełne and Tatra Mocne.

== Logo ==
The Lezajsk's logo features a blue and red shield with a cursive L on the foreground.

== See also ==
- Polish beer
- Żywiec Brewery
- Elbrewery
- Warka Brewery
- Cieszyn Brewery
