= Warka Brewery =

Polish brewery

- Industry: Alcoholic beverage
- Website: www.warka.com.pl

Warka
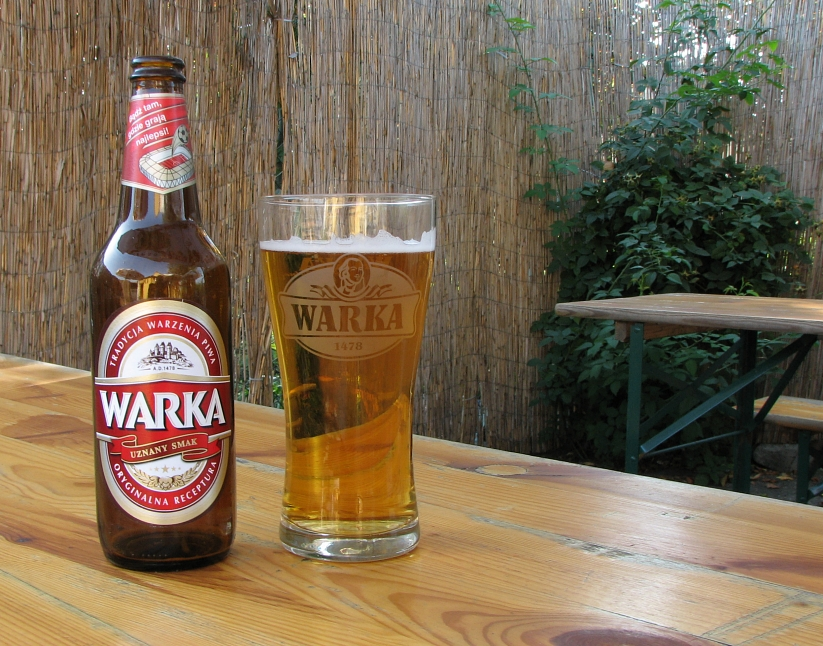
- Type: Beer
- Origin: Poland
- Introduced: 1478
- Alcohol by volume: 5.2%
- Style: Pale lager
- Website: www.warka.com.pl

The Warka Brewery /ˈvɑːrkə/ (Polish pronunciation: [ˈvarka]) is one of Poland's oldest breweries and belongs to the Żywiec Group. Żywiec Group has four main breweries: Żywiec Brewery, Elbrewery, Leżajsk Brewery and Warka Brewery, and is majority owned by the Dutch Heineken Group. The brewery is in the historic center of Warka, Poland.

== Brand ==
The company claims that in 1478 Bolesław V, the Mazovian Prince, reserved to Warka the exclusive right to supply beer to his court. The current plant was opened in 1975, under the Zakłady Piwowarskie w Warszawie (Warsaw Brewing Industries). Warka Brewery was purchased in 1999 by Grupa Żywiec S.A. The brewery was modernized in 2004 and now has a production capacity between 200-350 million litres annually. It is the second largest brewery in Grupa Żywiec.

The Warka Brewery makes three products: Warka Classic, Warka Strong, and "Królewskie," the latter meaning "royal."

== Marketing ==
Warka Classic Beer is well known for its distinct red packaging, the label of the export bottle and can, and the medals which indicates the beer's quality. The inscription 1478 Privilege of Delivery For Prince's Court.

== See also ==
- Polish beer
- Żywiec Brewery
- Elbrewery
- Leżajsk Brewery
- Cieszyn Brewery
- List of oldest companies
