= Browar Łomża =

Polish brewery

Coordinates: 53.1595°N 22.0387°E

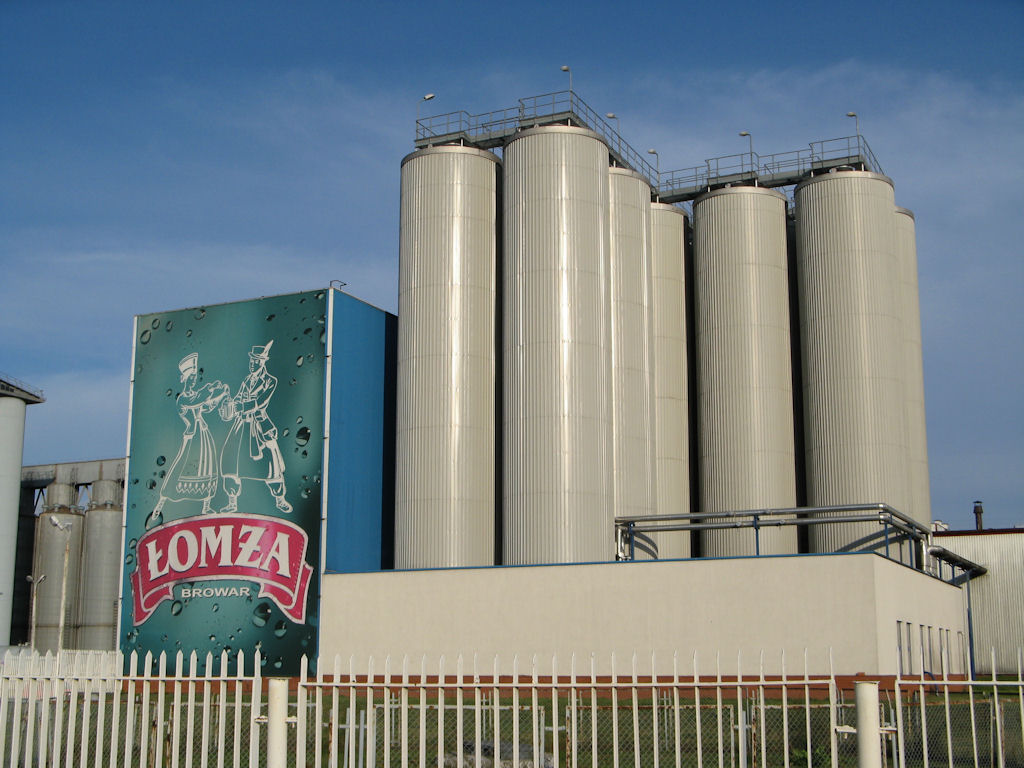
- Browar Lomza brewery (2004)
- Interactive map of Browar Łomża
- Location: Łomża, Poland
- Opened: 1968
- Annual production volume: 850,000 hectolitres
- Owner: Polish Brewery Van Pur

The Browar Łomża ([ˈbrɔ.var ˈwɔm.ʐa]) is Poland's fourth largest brewery. Browar Łomża Sp. z o.o. launched the plant in 1968. In 2007, it was purchased by Royal Unibrew. In 2011, it was sold to Polish Brewery Van Pur of Warsaw. The Browar Łomża brewery is located in Łomża, Poland.

== Brand ==
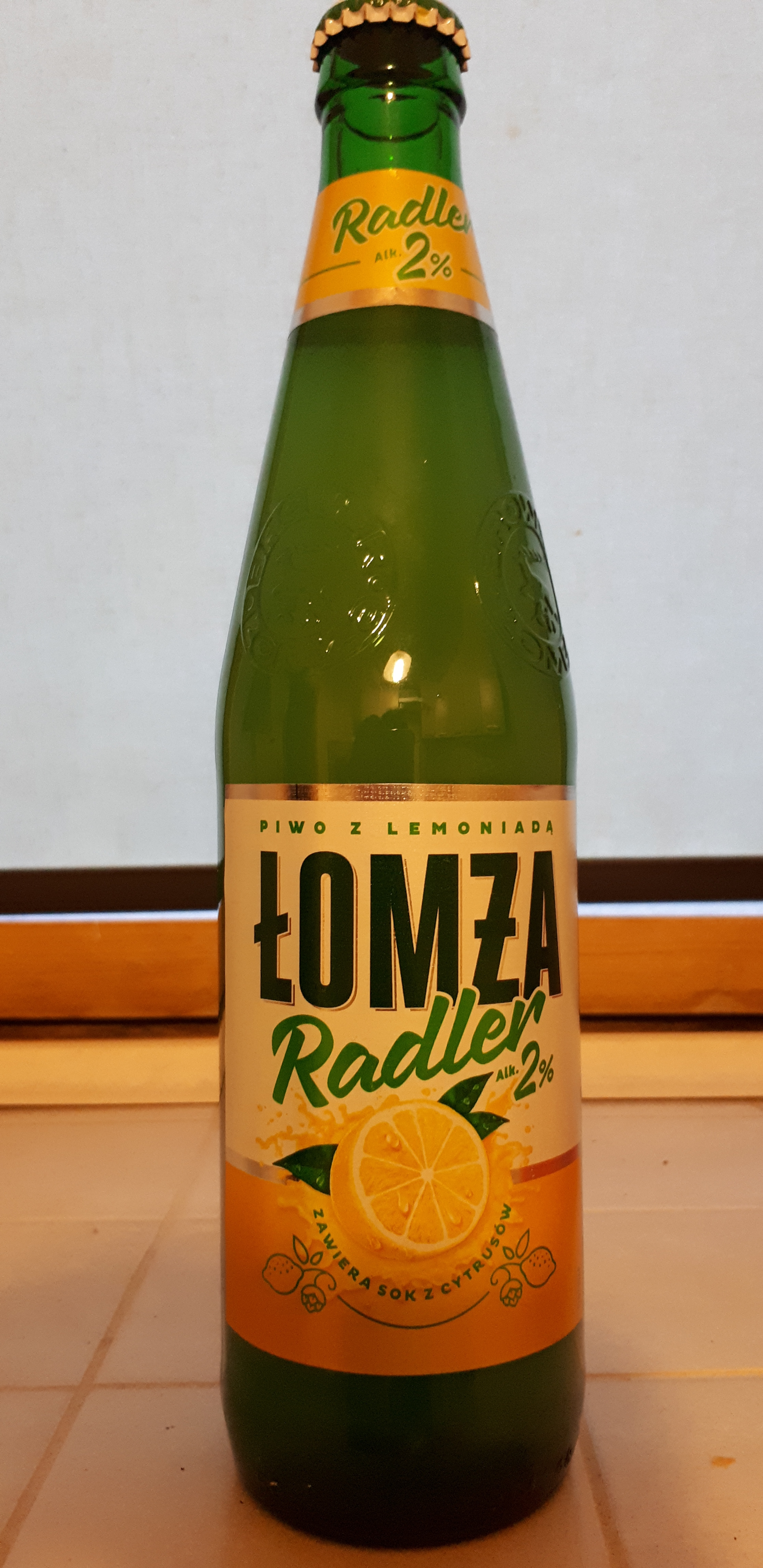
Łomża Lemon Radler

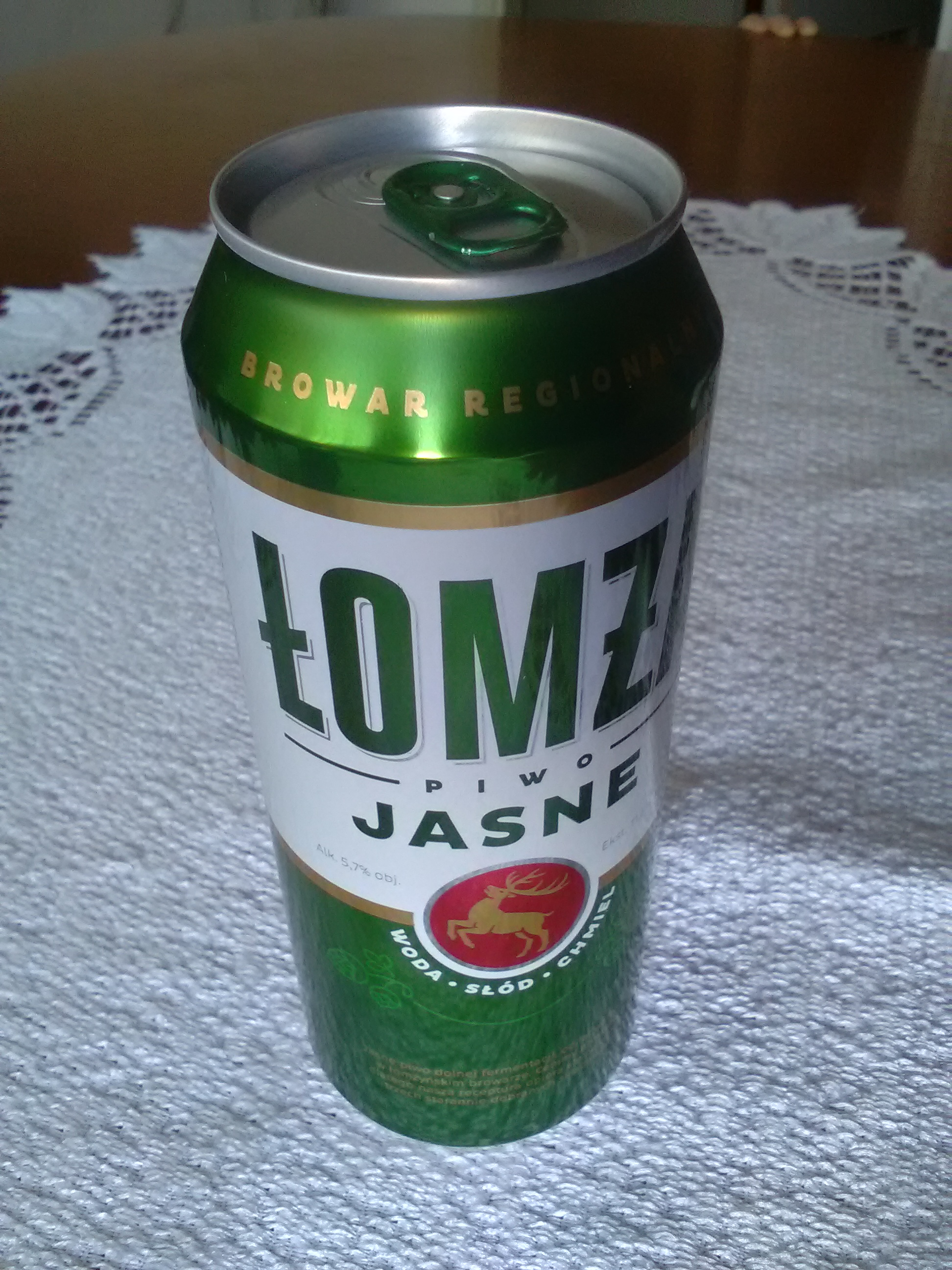
Łomża Jasne in can.

Browar Łomża Brewery has been brewing since 1968. The plant was modernized in 2004 and has a capacity to brew up to 850 thousand hectolitres. Traditionally it used to brew three slightly different beers: "Kurpie", "Wyborowe", "Export" and "Jasne". Later came "Łomża Strong" but it was not particularly successful and has now been discontinued. In 2010, Browar Łomża came up with a new taste "miodowe" (honey). After ownership changes and due to marketing campaigns, new brands such as "Łomża niepasteryzowane" (unpasteurised) and "Łomża Export niepasteryzowane" are gaining popularity.

== Marketing ==
The label shows two Kurpie folk people dancing on a label and the deer of the coats of arms of Łomża.

== See also ==
- Polish beer
- Royal Unibrew
