= Żywiec Brewery =

Polish brewery

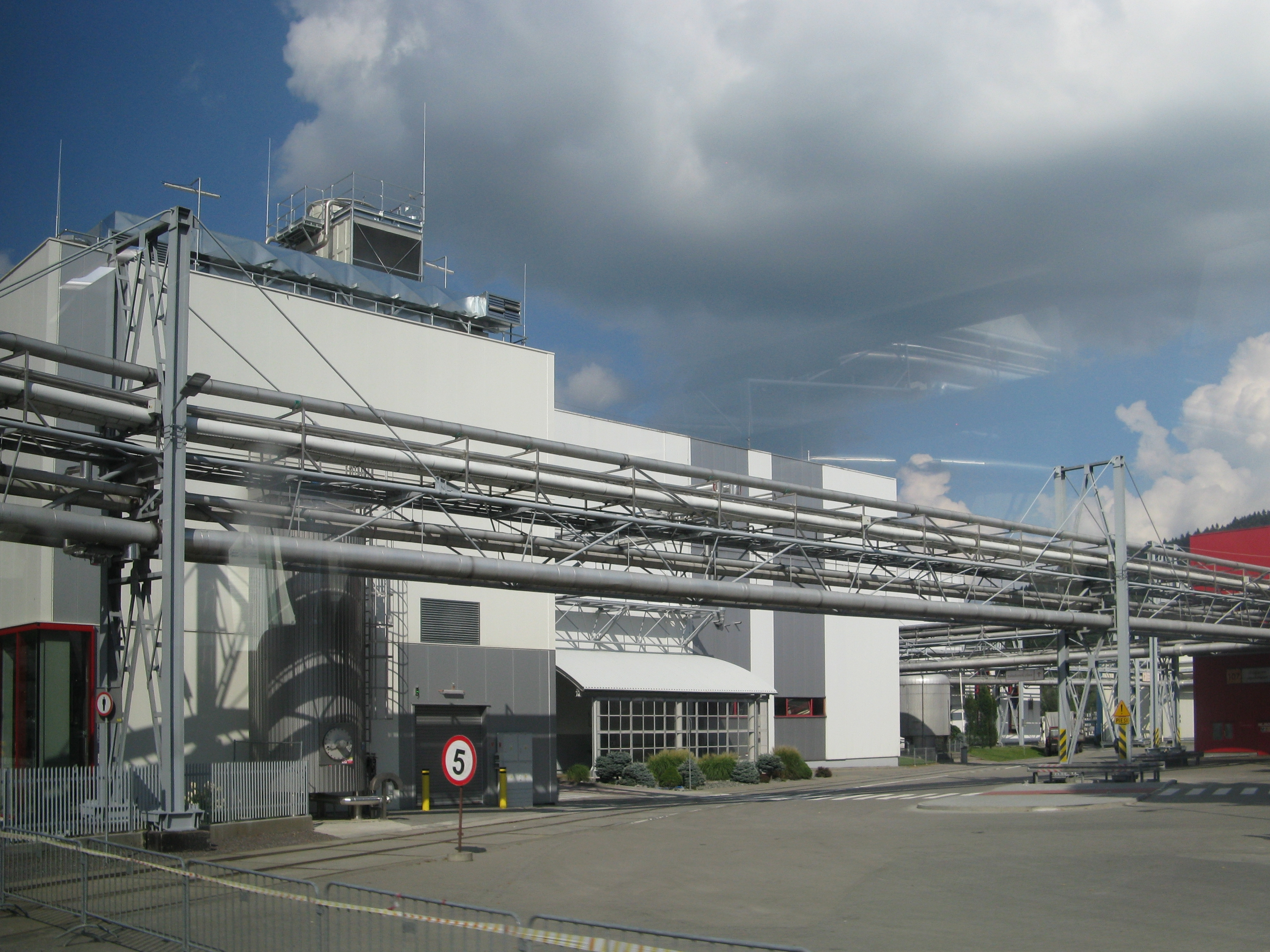
- Żywiec Brewery in 2018.
- Type: Beer
- Origin: Poland
- Introduced: 1856; 170 years ago
- Alcohol by volume: 5.5 %
- Style: Pale lager
- Website: en.grupazywiec.pl/marki/zywiec/

Żywiec Brewery (Polish pronunciation: [ˈʐɨvjɛt͡s]) is one of the largest breweries and beer producers in Poland. Founded in 1856 in the town of Żywiec, the brewery manufactures pale lager with a 5.5% alcohol volume. Grupa Żywiec S.A. consists of five main breweries: Żywiec Brewery, Elbrewery, Leżajsk, Warka Brewery and Browar Namysłów. Currently, the Dutch Heineken Group (Heineken International Beheer B.V.), with a 99% shareholding, has control over its major operations. The brewery has the capacity of producing 5 million hectolitres a year, making it the largest brewery in Grupa Żywiec. In 2025 the Żywiec Group announced it would close the brewery located at Namysłów in 2026, citing prices and declining beer market.

== History ==
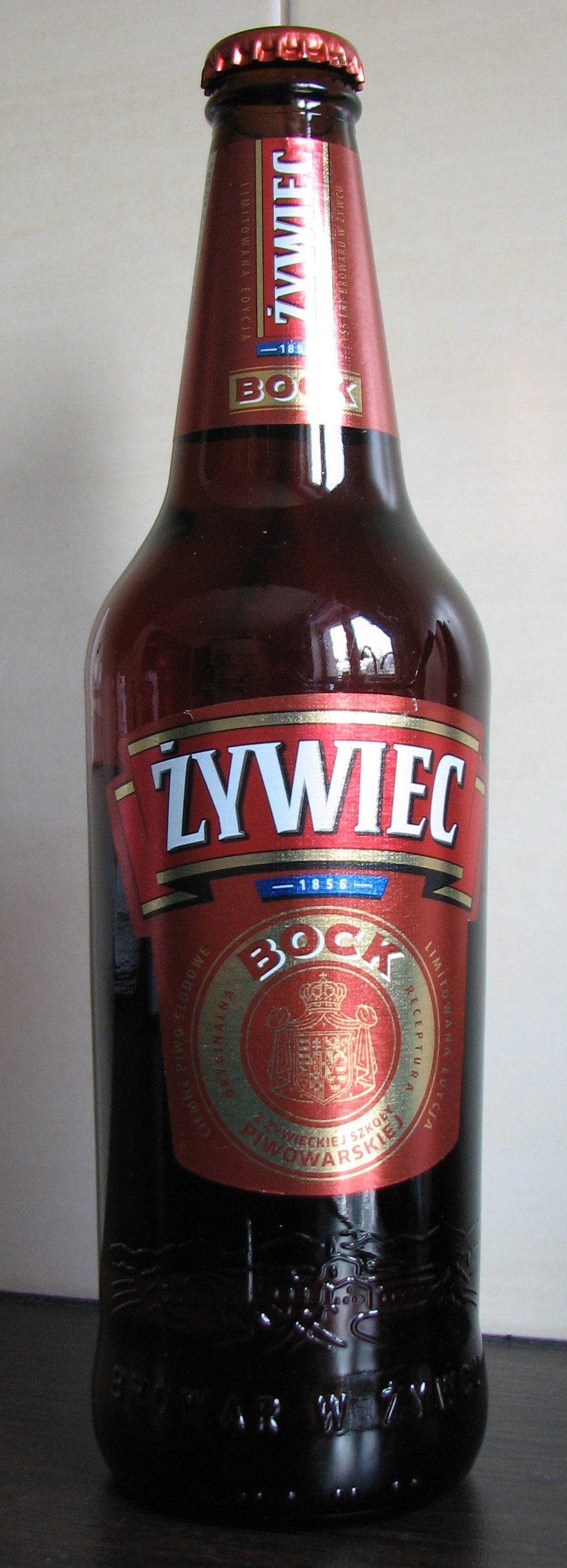
Żywiec Bock

The brewery started operating in 1856 in the town of Żywiec, which was then part of Austrian Poland. It was owned by the Habsburg Imperial Family until its confiscation by the post-WWII Communist government of Poland. At the beginning of the 1990s a court case was started by the descendants of the original owners, who sued the Polish government demanding $77 million compensation for the nationalisation and the use of the Habsburg family name and coat of arms for marketing purposes. The case was settled out of court on undisclosed terms in December 2005.

Żywiec Brewery began distribution to other towns of the Austro-Hungarian Empire in 1913. In the 1990s, the brewery was acquired and modernized by Heineken International.

== Beers ==
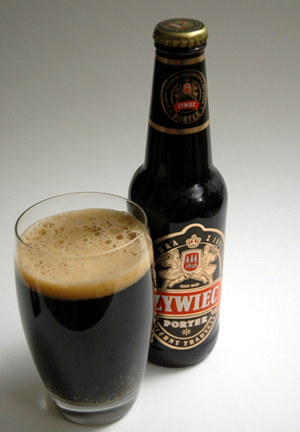
Żywiec Porter

The brewery produces several brands of beer, usually pale lagers ranging from 5.5% to 9.5% abv, including Żywiec Jasne Pełne or Żywiec Beer, a 5.5% abv pale lager, which has been brewed in the town of Żywiec, Poland for almost 150 years, and Żywiec Porter, a dark porter once brewed in Cieszyn Brewery.

Żywiec Beer is sold by the 1pt. can, 1pt. bottles and by the keg. In the United States, it is sold by 12-pack and 6-pack bottles (330 ml / US 11.2 oz.) as well as 500ml cans and bottles. It is still brewed by means of traditional methods using all-natural ingredients and mountain spring water.

== Logo ==
The Żywiec logo includes all of the most important historical symbols of the brewery and Poland itself. Żywiec Beer's prominent front label displays a man and woman, who dance the Krakowiak, a traditional dance of the area of Kraków in historic Lesser Poland. This dancing couple is dressed in classic Polish folk dancing clothes. Kraków's coat of arms is represented with the crown in the middle of the couple. The coat of arms is also represented by the three spruce trees displayed on the bottom of the label and the year 1856 on top underneath the crown. The name Żywiec is placed on the red sash across the middle of the label with the golden trimming. The Żywiec logo is the most famous mark and brand of beer in Poland and the trademark of the entire brewery.

== See also ==
- Polish beer
- Elbrewery
- Leżajsk Brewery
- Warka Brewery
- Męskie Granie, a concert tour initiated by Żywiec Brewery
