= Upper Silesia Brewery =

Brewery in Zabrze, Poland

Coordinates: 53.1595°N 22.0387°E

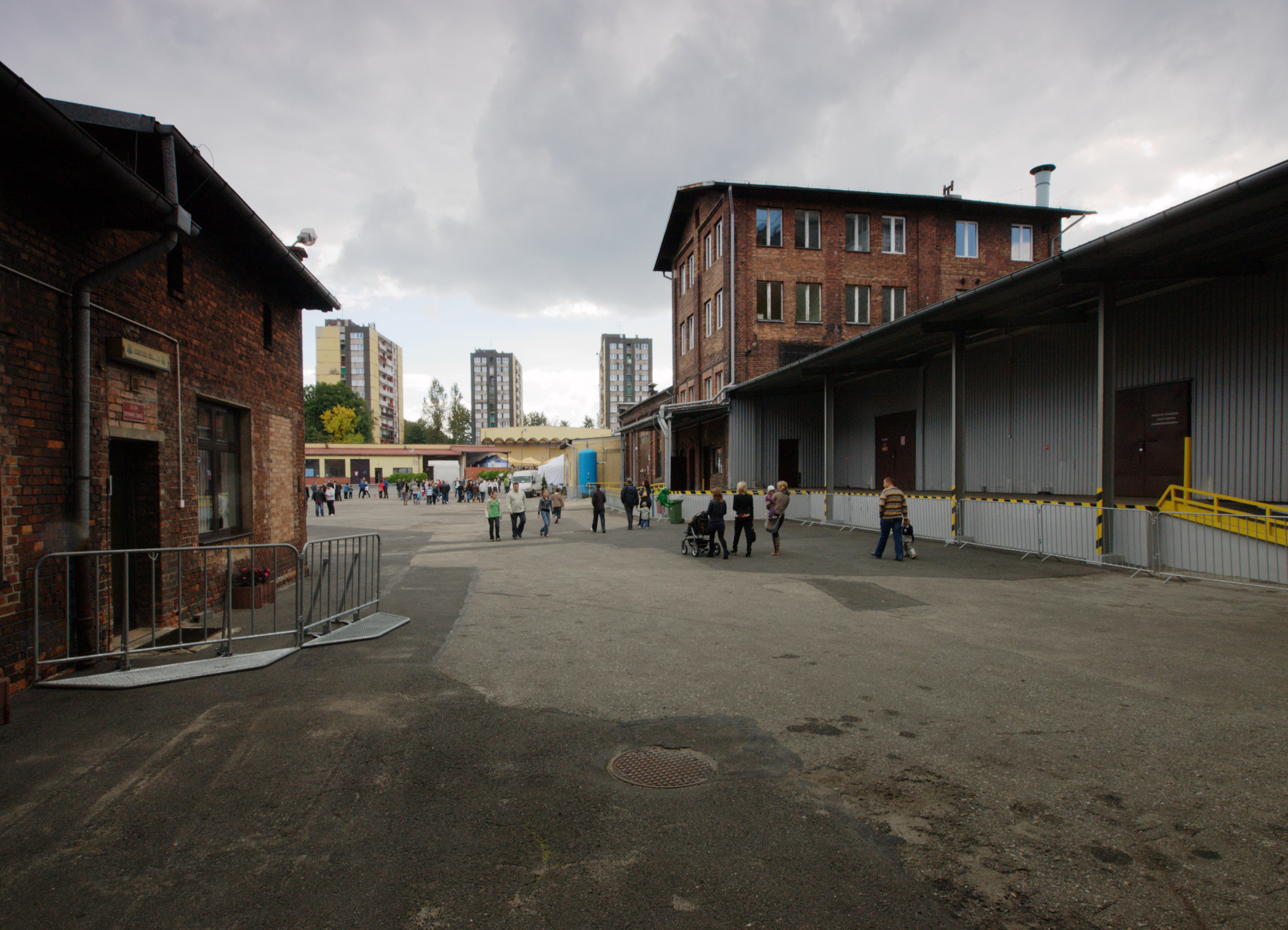
- Brewery in Zabrze
- Interactive map of Upper Silesia Brewery
- Location: Zabrze, Poland
- Opened: 1860
- Annual production volume: 680,000 hectolitres per year
- Owner: Van Pur

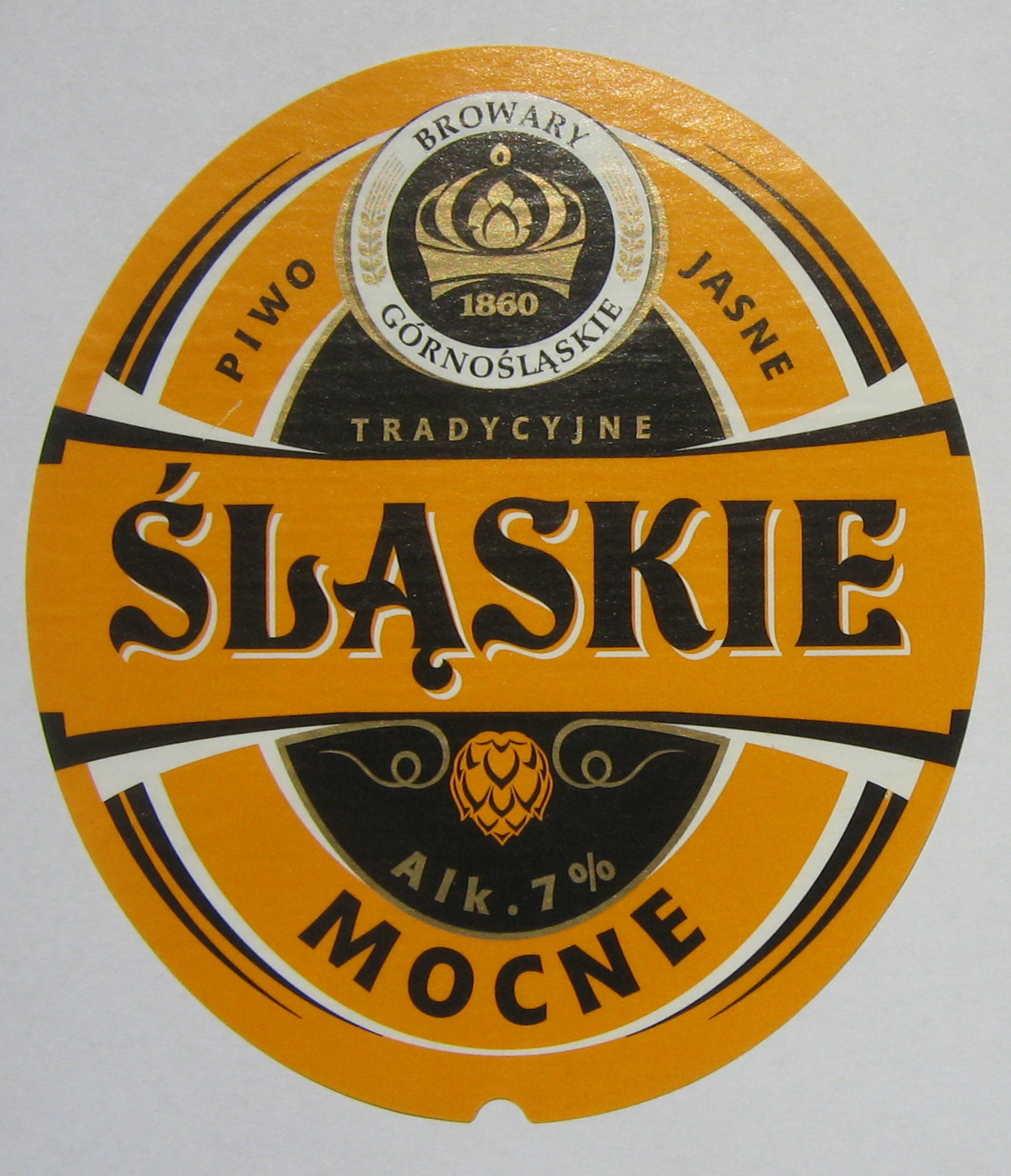
Śląskie beer label

The Upper Silesia Brewery, also called Browary Górnośląskie w Zabrzu, is a brewery in Zabrze, Poland, owned by the Van Pur brewery conglomerate.

== History ==
The industrial brewery in Zabrze was founded in 1860 by Loebal Haendler. In 1896 the family transformed the company into a joint stock company under the name Oberschlesische Bierbrauerei Aktien Gesellschaft vormals L. Haendler (Upper Silesian Brewery Joint Stock Company, formerly L. Haendler). In 1920, the plant was taken over by Ostwerke AG in Berlin. In 1928 the following year the owner of the brewery has been brewing the German concern de:Berliner-Kindl-Schultheiss-Brauerei (Schultheiss-Patzenhofer AG), which owned it until World War II. The brewery operated under the name Schultheiss-Patzenhofer-Brauerei, Abt. Hindenburg, and since 1938 as a member of Patzenhofer.

During World War II, the brewery buildings were destroyed. It was rebuilt in the years 1958–1963. In 1963 they established Zabrzańskie Betting Beer-Malt, in which the addition of the brewery in Zabrze, entered the factories in Siemianowice Slaskie, Bytom, Racibórz, Rybnik, Częstochowa and Gliwice. In 1975, the company adopted the name of the Upper Silesian breweries and combined them with breweries in Tychy in 1981.

In 1991, after privatization, the brewery in Zabrze was transformed into a company wholly owned by the State Treasury under the name of Upper Silesian Plant Brewing SA. However, the firm struggled financially and in 1999 declared bankruptcy. They survived restructuring and were purchased by Van Pur Group in 2005. After massive upgrading, the plant currently brews 680,000 hectolitres of beer every year.

== Brands ==
- Super Piwosz
- Górnik Zabrze
- Śląskie Pełne
- Śląskie Strong
- Śląskie Extra Strong
