= Van Pur =

Brewing company based in Poland

Logo of Van Pur

Browar Van Pur is a limited liability company based in Poland. The company operates 5 breweries in Jędrzejów, Koszalin, Łomża, Rakszawa and Zabrze. The headquarters of Van Pur is located in Warsaw.

== History ==
Van Pur is a Polish company launched at the time of the collapse of Communism in 1989, by Zbigniew Wantusiak, and Siegfried Pura of Astrid Pura. After a period of business experiments in unrelated fields, the company focused entirely on the production and distribution of beer. It is now one of the fastest growing beer manufacturers in Poland. In December 2010, Van Pur bought the Polish branch of the Danish Royal Unibrew group. In exchange, Royal Unibrew received 20% of shares of Van Pur in Poland with Van Pur retaining buyers options of the shares. In 2011 Van Pur, owned five breweries with the total production capacity of 4 million hectolitre of beer annually. October 15, 2012, Van Pur exercised its buyer's option on the 20% shares previously held by Royal Unibrew for 111 million PLN. As of now, it owns about 10% of the market share in Poland.

After more than two decades of developing its competency in the beer market, Van Pur launched a new branch of products in 2013. The company's portfolio expanded to include non-alcoholic malt-based soft drinks.

== Product portfolio ==
Van Pur's beer brands include Van Pur, Łomża, Strzelec, BROK, Śląskie and Karpackie - their share in the domestic beer market puts the company at the fourth position among beer producers in Poland. The product range is complemented by malt drinks brands: Razowy and Jędrzej. The company also provides private-label products for the largest European retail chains.

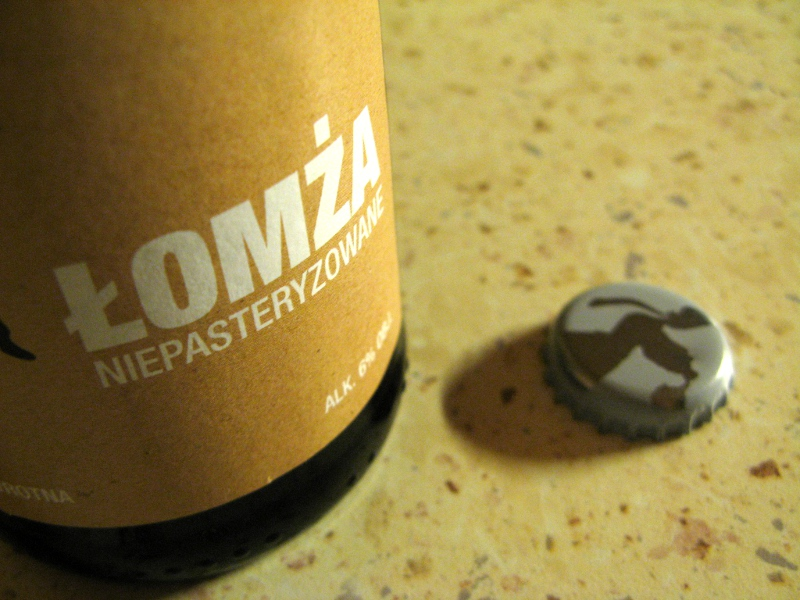
Łomża beer

=== Lewiatan Holding S.A. ===
Goldbrayner Piwo Jasne [500ml can; 4% ABV], Goldbrayner Radler [500ml can; 2% ABV (55% Beer, 45% Lemonade)], Goldbrayner Strong [500ml can; 6.6% ABV], Goldbrayner Super Mocne ("Super Strong") [500ml can; 9% ABV].

=== Morrisons ===
Morrisons Premium Lager [440 ml can; 4.8% ABV]

=== Tesco ===
Tesco Alcohol-Free Beer [500ml can; 0.5% ABV], Tesco-Value Beer [500 ml can; 3.5% ABV], Tesco-Value Piwo Jasne Pełne ("Sparkling Lager Beer") [500ml can; 4% ABV], Tesco Lager [500 ml can; 4% ABV], Tesco Premium Lager [500ml can; 5% ABV], Tesco Strong Lager [500ml can; 7% ABV].

=== Italy ===
In Italy, van Pur is selling beers under the labels: van Pur, Edelmeister, Cortes (a Corona-Mexican style beer with additional tequila flavour), Lomza (low alcoholic radler beer), Barley (in 3 different gradation: classic 4°, strong 6.6° and extra-strong 9°), Hermann Müller (lager and weizen), Karpackie, Hollebräu and Roger (even as non-alcoholic one), Dahlberg (only as 500 ml can).
