= Browar Jędrzejów =

Polish brewery

Browar Jędrzejów is a brewery in Jędrzejów, Poland. It is currently owned by Van Pur. It is well known for its Strzelec brand, which translates into Sagittarius.

== History ==
The origins of the brewery industry in Jędrzejów date back to the first half of the nineteenth century. In 1871, the plant was bought by Jan Frohlichen who consistently modernized it. In the years 1904 - 1906 on the site of the old brewery in existence since 1823 was erected from scratch new buildings, which were adjusted to brew beer Pilsner . The power plant was launched in 1910 it totaled 4 000 hectoliters of beer per year. In the interwar period it has been increased to 8 000 hectoliters.

After World War II, the brewery was nationalized. In 1994, the plant purchased an entrepreneur from Cracow, Adam Brodowski, who modernized the dilapidated brewery and formed a partnership Malopolska Browar Strzelec SA (1995). The company gradually began to increase its production capacity and has emerged as a formidable producer of beer in Poland. Brewery Strzelec has teamed up with Austrian partner - the brewery Ottakringer Brauerei. In 1999 he began a quest to take majority stake in the company Perła Brewery in Lublin eventually earning with partners 48% stake in the company. In 2000 the Strzelec acquired from the Brewers Upper Silesian factory their brewery in Rybnik and the Rybnicki brand, the acquisition of which began construction brewing group. In 2002 Strzelec merged with BROK Brewery, creating a new company called Browary Polskie Brok-Strzelec SA. It was publicly traded on the Warsaw Stock Exchange. The production capacity of the brewery in Jędrzejów was then 350 thousand hectoliters of beer per year.

In 2003 they were serious financial problems of the company due to growing debt of the merged company. In 2004 the owners of the brewery decided to cease operations in the brewing industry. In April 2005, Brok-Strzelec SA was bought by the Danish company Royal Unibrew. in 2010, Unibrew's entire Polish portfolio of brands was sold to Van Pur.

Currently, the brewery in Jędrzejów can produce about 420,000 hectoliters of beer per year.

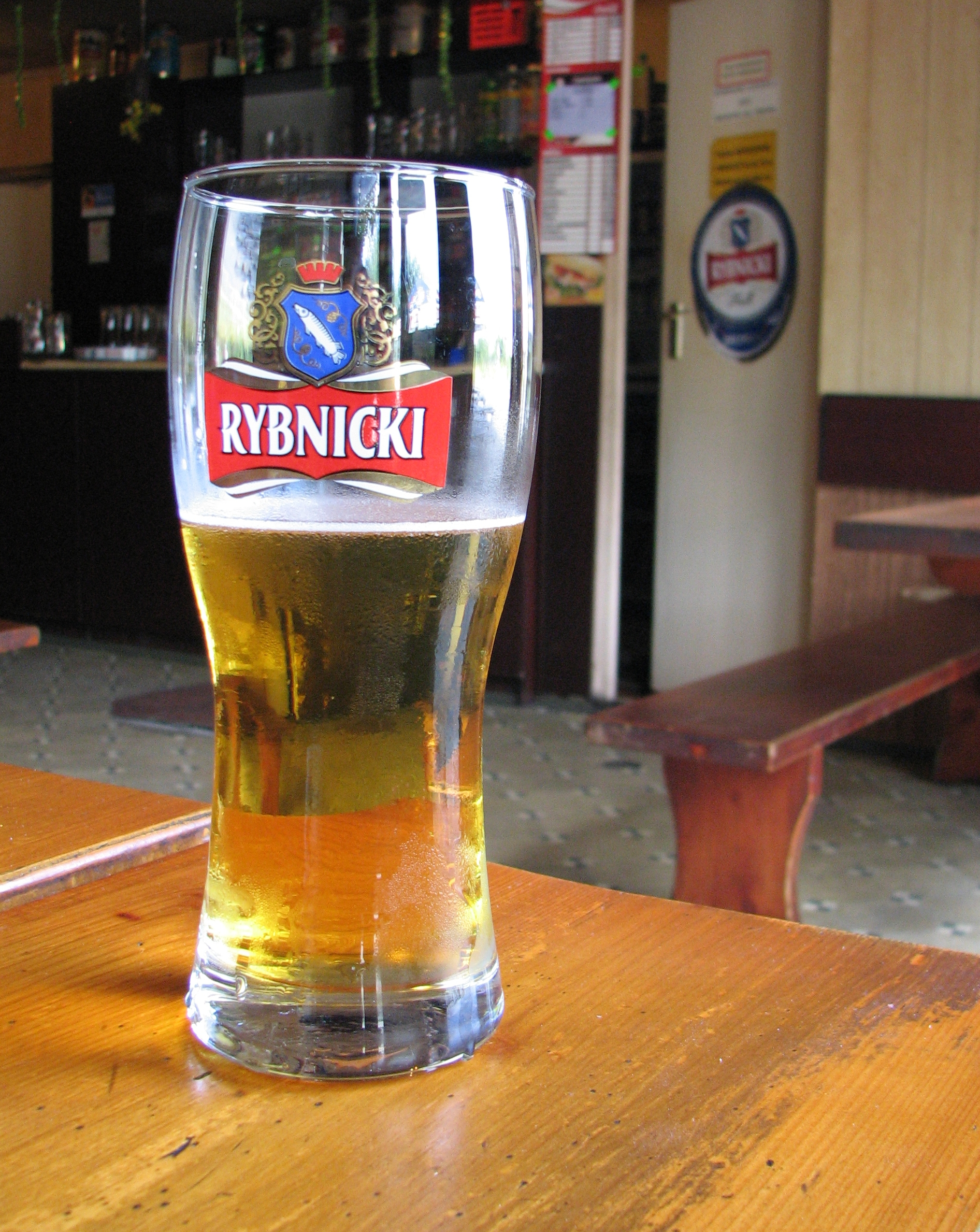
Rybnicki Full

== Brands ==
- Strzelec Bright Full
- Strzelec Strong
- Rybnicki Full
