= Browar Koszalin =

Brewery in Koszalin, Poland

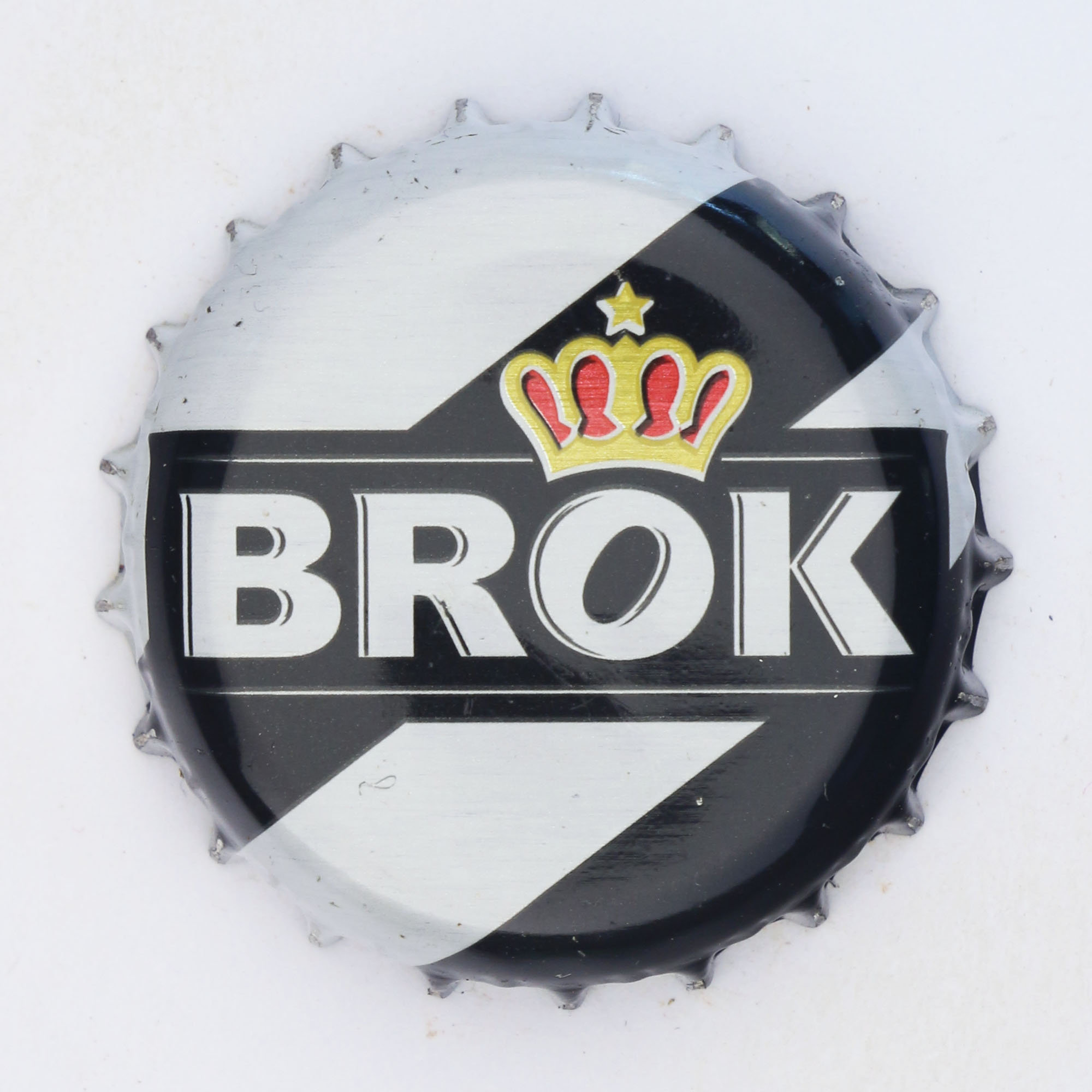
- Type: Brewery
- Location: Koszalin, Poland
- Opened: 1873
- Owned by: Van Pur

Active beers
Brok
Name	Type

Browar Koszalin is a brewery in Koszalin, Poland that is located in a Neo-Gothic building, built in the second half of the nineteenth century, that brews BROK beer. It belongs to the Van Pur brewery conglomerate.

== History ==
Koszalin brewery was founded in 1868 year as a craft beer. Beer started to be mass-produced in 1874. In 1883 it joined the Pomeranian brewing company owned by Richard Rückfortha. The plant at this time has been significantly expanded and modernized. After the end of World War I, the brewery passed into the hands of the family Gerlachów. It has been expanded again to 30,000 hectoliters of beer annually.

After World War II, the brewery in Koszalin for a short period ceased production while under Soviet management. Most beer was shipped to warehouses of the Soviet Army. After Soviet occupation the Polish plant was renovated. In 1960, the brewery was incorporated into the Koszalin Plant Beer-Słodowniczych company.

After privatization in 1990, the brewery has acted as the company Koszalińskie breweries Brok SA. At that time the main shareholder in the brewery was the German company Holsten-Breurei AG. At the beginning of the twenty-first century, the company was renamed Breweries Brok SA. In 2002, the brewery merged with Strzelec since both cpmanies were facing financial difficulty. The new firm was called Brok-Strzelec SA and was publicly listed on Warsaw Stock Exchange. In 2005, the new firm was bought by the Danish company Royal Unibrew.

In December 2010, Van Pur bought the Polish branch of the Danish Royal Unibrew group. In exchange, Royal Unibrew received 20% of shares of Van Pur in Poland with Van Pur retaining buyers options of the shares. In 2011 Van Pur, owned five breweries with the total production capacity of 4 million hectolitre of beer annually. October 15, 2012 Van Pur exercised its buyers option on the 20% shares previously held by Royal Unibrew for 111 PLN. As of now, it owns about 10% of the market share in Poland.

The production capacity of the brewery industry in Koszalin are about 650,000 hectoliters of beer per year.

=== Microbrewery Kowal ===
Since 2008 in the cellars of the brewery operates a brewpub as an independent subsidiary. It was built in the 190's as a disco theme called "Disco Pub Brok", but then was converted into "Milton brewery cellars."

From here microbrewery Kowal was conceived. BROK bought and brewing still from German company Kaspar Schulz with a capacity of over 1,000 hectoliters of beer per year. The brewery restaurant produces several types of beer unfiltered and unpasteurized unique to the restaurant.

== Brands ==
=== BROK ===
- Brok Export - alcohol content of 5.2%
- Brok Sambor
- Brok Strong
- Brok Sambor unfiltered
- Kanclerz - Euro Pale Lager ABV 6%

=== Kowal ===
- Kowal Bock
- Kowal Bright
- Kowal Dark
- Kowal Honey
- Kowal Weizen
