= Beer in Denmark =

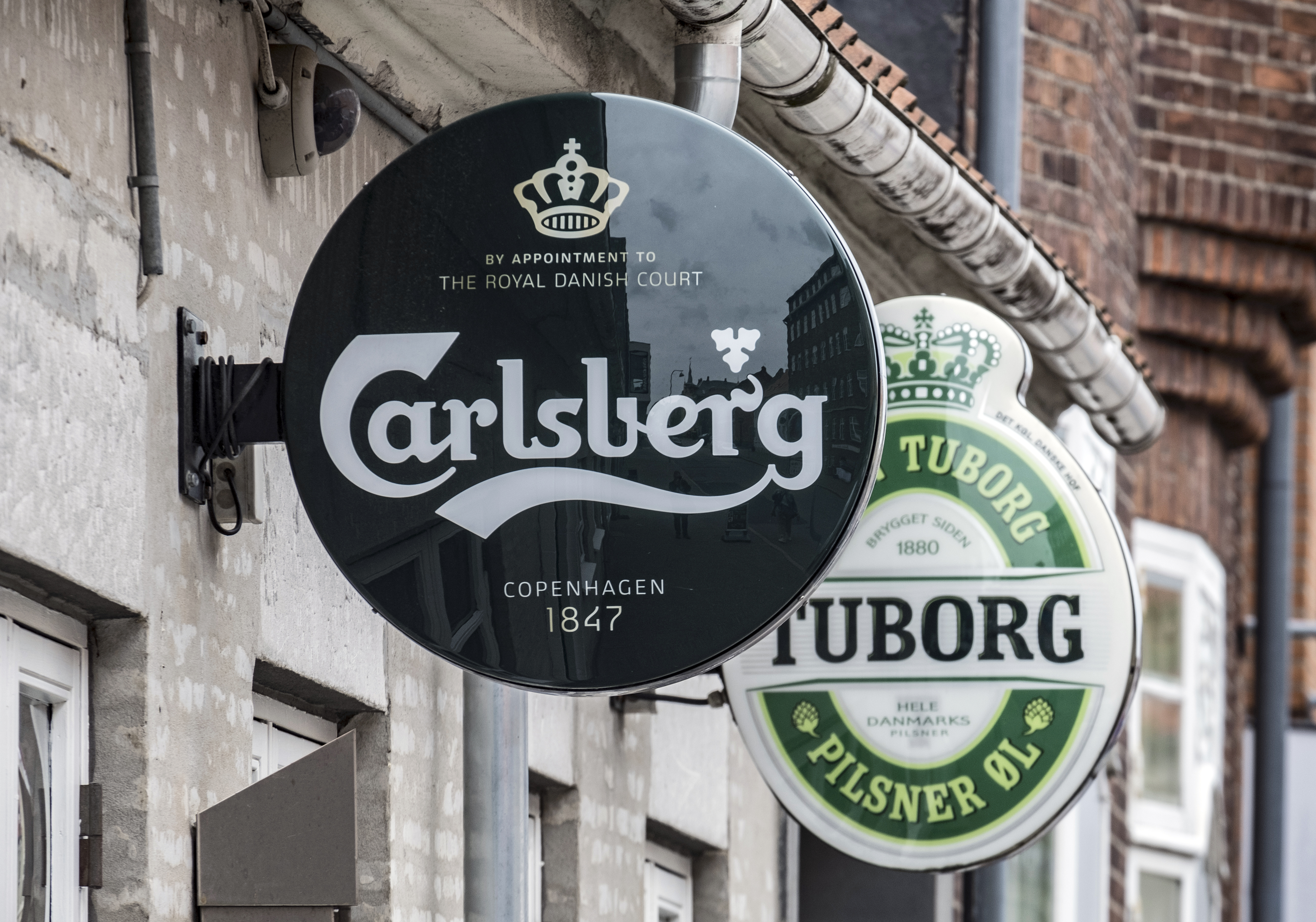
Carlsberg and Tuborg signs in Fredericia

The beer market in Denmark is dominated by the brands Carlsberg and Tuborg. Since Tuborg was acquired by Carlsberg in 1970, Carlsberg has held a near-monopoly. A number of regional breweries, however, managed to survive, and most of them merged into Royal Unibrew in 2005. As of 2020, Ratebeer lists over 300 active breweries in Denmark, most of which are microbreweries.

== Economy ==
The Danish market is dominated by pale lager, with more than 95% of total sales. However, stout and other dark beers are increasing in popularity, a trend driven by the market growth of mid-priced beers. The local microbreweries are strong innovators and produce a wide variety of beer styles, including strong IPAs and stouts.

Danish beer production was 723 million litres in 2001, and increased to 870 million litres by 2005.

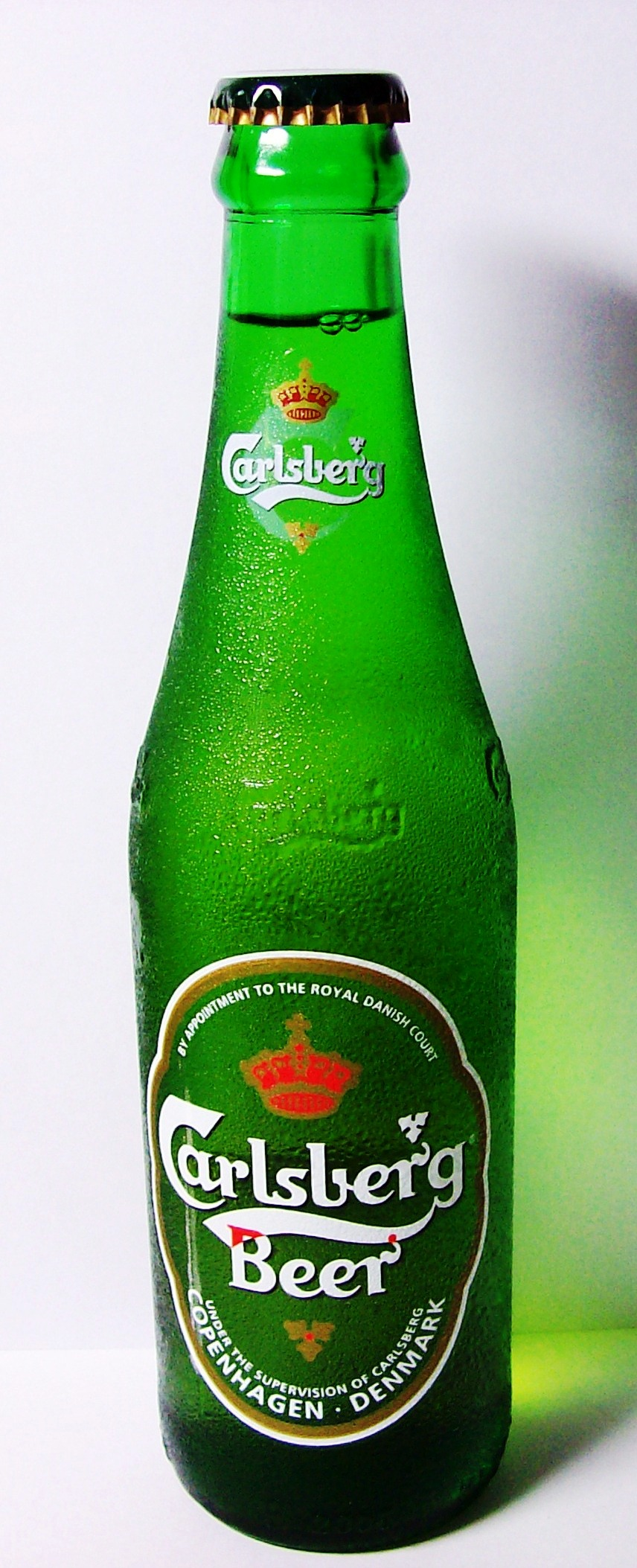
Carlsberg beer

Imported beer accounted for only 8% of total volume sales in 2006. This indicates that beer sales in Denmark are dominated by domestic brands; however, imports increased by 14% in 2006 to reach 36.3 million litres. Germany is the most important source market for imports.

Danish beer exports was 296.1 million litres in 2006. Germany continues to be the most important export market for Danish beer. The German market accounted for 30% of exports in 2006.

Based on data from the Danish Beer Association (Bryggeriforeningen), beer consumption for 2005 was 539 million litres.

== Jacobsen ==
Danish industrialist J. C. Jacobsen revolutionized the world of brewing when his brewery, Carlsberg, bred a pure strain of lager yeast, Saccharomyces carlsbergensis. This enabled the breweries to achieve a large and consistent output, and lager has been the most popular style of beer in Denmark since Carlsberg started selling it in 1847. Smaller breweries in Denmark suffered greatly under the Carlsberg market dominance, especially during the middle of the 20th century, and this led to a large reduction in available beer quality and styles. In recent years the interest in higher quality beer has risen sharply, and the Danish beer landscape is now dotted with several small breweries and brewpubs, producing a wide range of beers.

== Common types of beer ==
=== Classic ===
An all malt pale lager with more colour and taste. The classic type is named after the Tuborg or the Carlsberg.

=== Guld ===
Guld (Gold) is a name commonly applied to pale lagers with a strength around 5.7% abv. Examples include: Tuborg Guld (5.8%), Carlsberg Sort Guld (5.8%), Harboe Premium Gold (5.9%), Svaneke Mørk Guld (5.7%) and Wiibroe Guld Export (5.7%) usually referred to as Wiibroe Flag due to the many small Danish flags on the label.

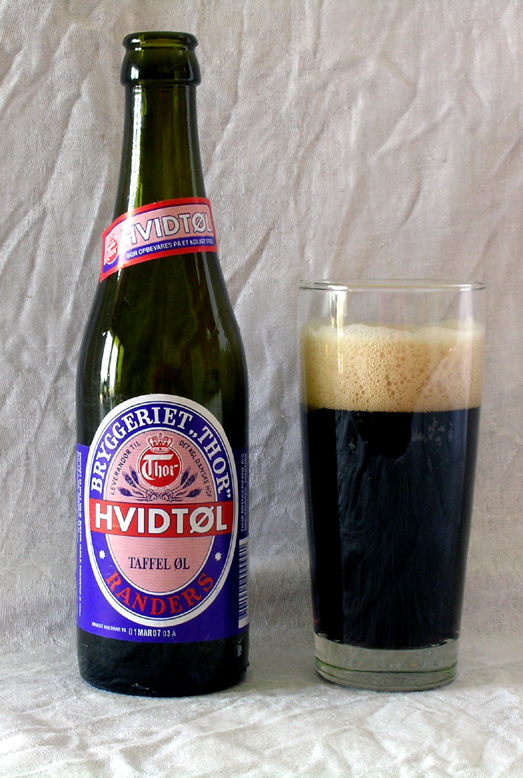
A bottle of hvidtøl

=== Hvidtøl ===
Hvidtøl (White-beer) is a traditional Danish beer. It is usually under 2% abv, and quite malty and sweet. It was once the most common beer in Denmark but sales have declined so that it is mainly only bought at Christmas when it is served with risengrød. The beer was originally termed "white" as it was made from kilned malt, which was developed in the late 18th century in contrast to the malts dried over fires which produced smokey beers.

=== Julebryg ===
Julebryg and Juleøl (Christmas beer) are names given to beers marketed at Christmas. They vary in strength and style, though tend to be malty and around 6% abv. Examples include Tuborg Julebryg (a 5.6% pale lager), Svaneke Julebryg (a 5.6% dark lager), Fur Julebryg (a 6.5% brown ale), Fjordens Juleøl (a 6% dark lager), and Raasted Juleøl (an 8.5% dark ale). Additionally, Carlsberg 47 is slightly connected to the late autumn and Christmas.

=== Nisseøl ===
Nisseøl (literally nisse beer) is a dark, sweet hvidtøl (white beer, see above) which is sold around Christmas time in Denmark. It is not to be confused with julebryg, which is a much stronger Danish Christmas beer.

=== Påskeøl ===
Påskeøl (Easter beer) was the original seasonal beer, today the Christmas beers are more popular, but many Easter beers still remain. The Easter beer is a Danish tradition. Like Christmas beers, they are usually 5-6-7% lagers. Examples include: Carl's Påske, Tuborg Påskebryg, Royal Spring, Påskebryg 7,8% (Ørbæk Brewery), Fynsk Forår (Ørbæk Brewery).

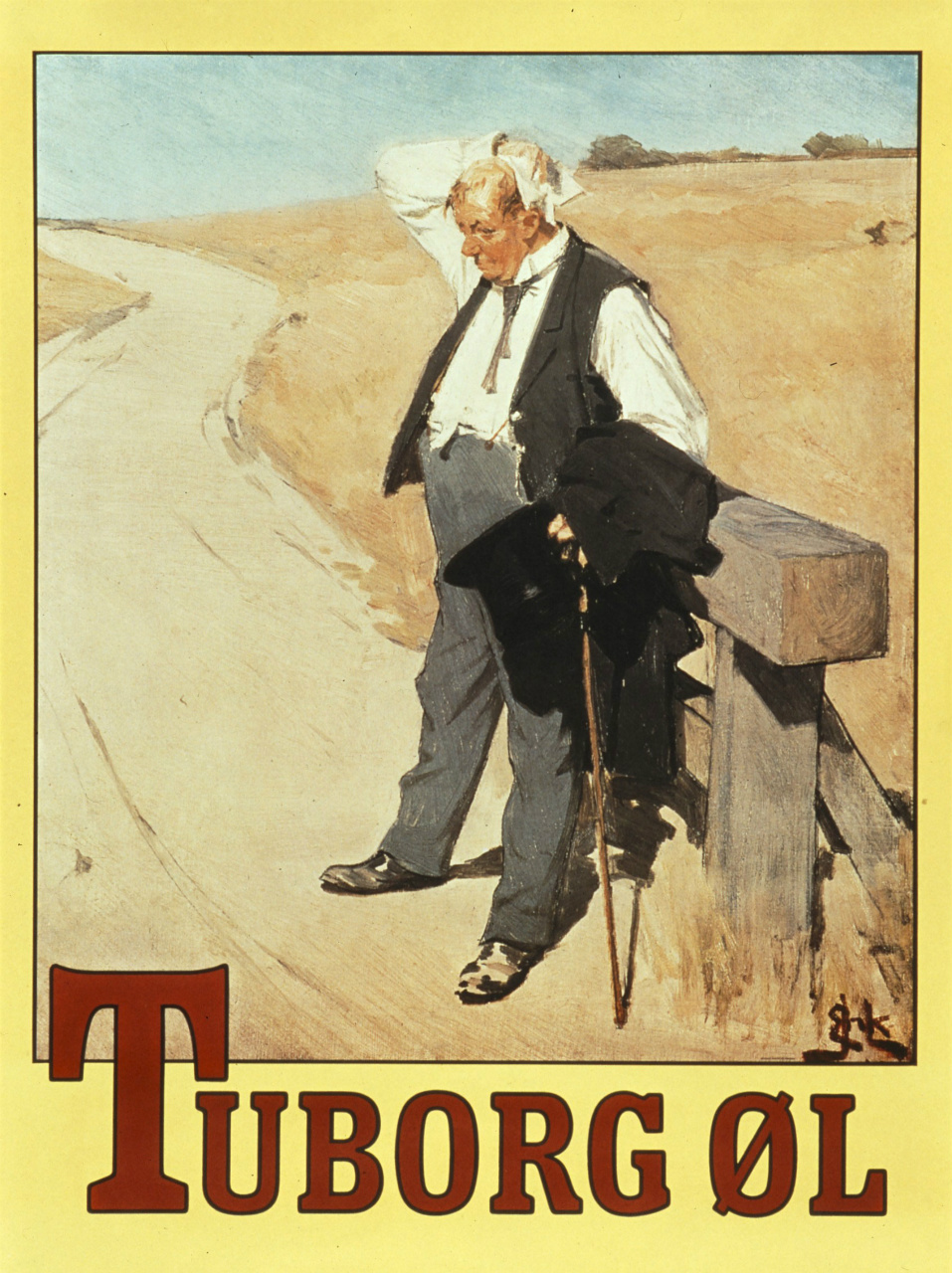
Tuborg advertisement from 1900, known as "The Thirsty Man."

=== Pale lager ===
The most common type of beer in Denmark is pale lager, simply known as Pilsner in Danish. For instance: Carlsberg Pilsner (often called "Hof" in Denmark), Grøn Tuborg, Tuborg klassisk (Tuborg Klassik), or Tuborg classic (Tuborg classic), Royal Pilsner. These pilsners have a moderate alcohol strength of 4,6% (by volume). A bit stronger pale lager (Pilsner) is the Guld (Gold) described above. Even stronger pale lagers are for instance Carlsberg Elephant (7.2%) and Tuborg Fine Festival (7.5%).

=== Strong lager ===
Strong lager (stærk øl or export) refers to pale lagers in the tax category III (6-8%) beers such as Carlsberg Elephant Beer, Tuborg Fine Festival, Albani Giraffe, Royal Selection.

=== Brown ales ===
Brown Ale is a common style, with Jacobsen being brewed by Carlsberg and Ørbæk Brewery, Skagen Bryghus.

=== Stouts and porters ===
Many microbreweries brew stouts and porters. Such styles have been popular in the region, historically including baltic porter.

=== IPA ===
India pale ales are also produced by many Danish microbreweries.

=== Low alcohol and non-alcohol beers ===
By Danish law beers with 0,0 % up to 0,5 % alcohol by volume are considered alcohol free. These beers have gained in popularity in recent years, with about 50 different brands produced in Denmark. Drinking alcohol free beer has become more socially accepted and the alcohol free beers brewed today taste better than they did a few years ago. Mikkeller is a major producer of alcohol free beers, with 16 different beers.

== Notable Breweries ==
- Amager Bryghus
- Bryghuset Møn
- Bryggeriet Djævlebryg
- Brøckhouse
- Carlsberg brewery
  - Tuborg
  - Jacobsen
- Evil Twin Brewing
- Fuglsang
- Föroya Bjór
- Greenland Brewhouse
- Harboes Bryggeri
- Mikkeller
- Nørrebro Bryghus
- Restorffs Bryggjarí
- Royal Unibrew
  - Albani Brewery
  - Ceres Brewery
  - Faxe Brewery
  - Maribo Bryghus
  - Odin Brewery
- Thisted Bryghus
- To Øl
- Tvedes Bryggeri
- Vestfyen

== See also ==
- Beer and breweries by region
