= List of companies of the Faroe Islands =

Location of the Faroe Islands

The Faroe Islands are an archipelago between the Norwegian Sea and the North Atlantic approximately halfway between Norway and Iceland, 320 kilometres (200 miles) north-northwest of mainland Scotland. The islands are an autonomous territory within the Kingdom of Denmark.

Economic troubles caused by a collapse of the Faroese fishing industry in the early 1990s brought high unemployment rates of 10 to 15% by the mid-1990s. Unemployment decreased in the later 1990s, down to about 6% at the end of 1998. By June 2008 unemployment had declined to 1.1%, before rising to 3.4% in early 2009. In December 2014 the unemployment was 3.2%. Nevertheless, the almost total dependence on fishing and fish farming means that the economy remains vulnerable. One of the biggest private companies of the Faroe Islands is the salmon-farming company Bakkafrost, which is the largest of the four salmon-farming companies in the Faroe Islands and the eighth-biggest in the world.

== Notable firms ==
This list includes notable companies with primary headquarters located in the country. The industry and sector follow the Industry Classification Benchmark taxonomy. Organizations which have ceased operations are included and noted as defunct.

Notable companies Status: P=Private, S=State; A=Active, D=Defunct
Name	Industry	Sector	Headquarters	Founded	Notes	Status	
Atlantic Airways	Consumer services	Airlines	Sørvágur	1987	Airline	P	A
Atlantic Petroleum	Oil & gas	Exploration & production	Tórshavn	1998	Private oil and gas exploration	P	A
Bakkafrost	Consumer goods	Farming & fishing	Glyvrar	1968	Salmon farming	P	A
BankNordik	Financials Services	Banks	Tórshavn	1906	Financial Services	P	A
Dimmalætting	Consumer services	Publishing	Tórshavn	1877	Newspaper	P	A
Eik Banki	Financial services	Banks	Tórshavn	1832	Financial services	P	A
FaroeJet	Consumer services	Airlines	Vágar	2005	Airline, defunct 2006	P	D
Föroya Bjór	Consumer goods	Brewers	Klaksvík	1888	Brewery	P	A
Hey	Telecommunications	Mobile telecommunications	Tórshavn	2000	Mobile network	P	A
Kringvarp Føroya	Consumer services	Broadcasting & entertainment	Tórshavn	1957	Public television and radio station	P	A
Posta	Industrials	Delivery services	Tórshavn	1976	Postal services	P	A
Restorffs Bryggjarí	Consumer goods	Brewers	Tórshavn	1849	Brewery, defunct 2007	P	D
Rúsdrekkasøla Landsins	Consumer services	Food retailers & wholesalers	Tórshavn	1992	Alcoholic beverages retail	P	A
SEV	Utilities	Alternative electricity	Tórshavn	1946	Power, hydro-electrical	S	A
SeWave	Utilities	Alternative electricity	Tórshavn	2002	Wave farm project	P	A
Smyril Line	Industrials	Marine transportation	Tórshavn	1983	Shipping	P	A
Sosialurin	Consumer services	Publishing	Tórshavn	1927	Newspaper	P	A
Strandfaraskip Landsins	Consumer services	Travel & tourism	Suðuroy	1917	Public transportation	S	A
The Faroe Insurance Company	Financials	Full line insurance	Tórshavn	1965	Insurance	P	A

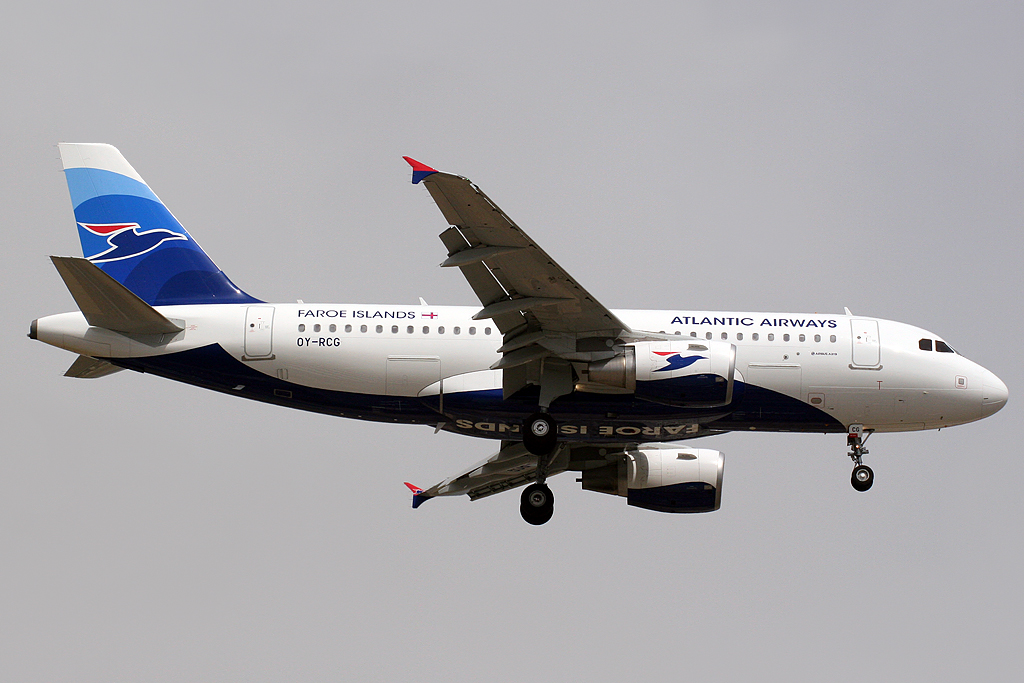
Atlantic Airways Airbus A319 landing at Barcelona–El Prat Airport.

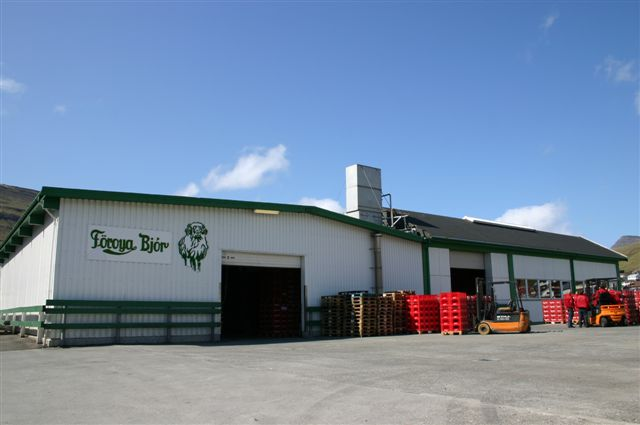
Föroya Bjór brewery in Klaksvík.

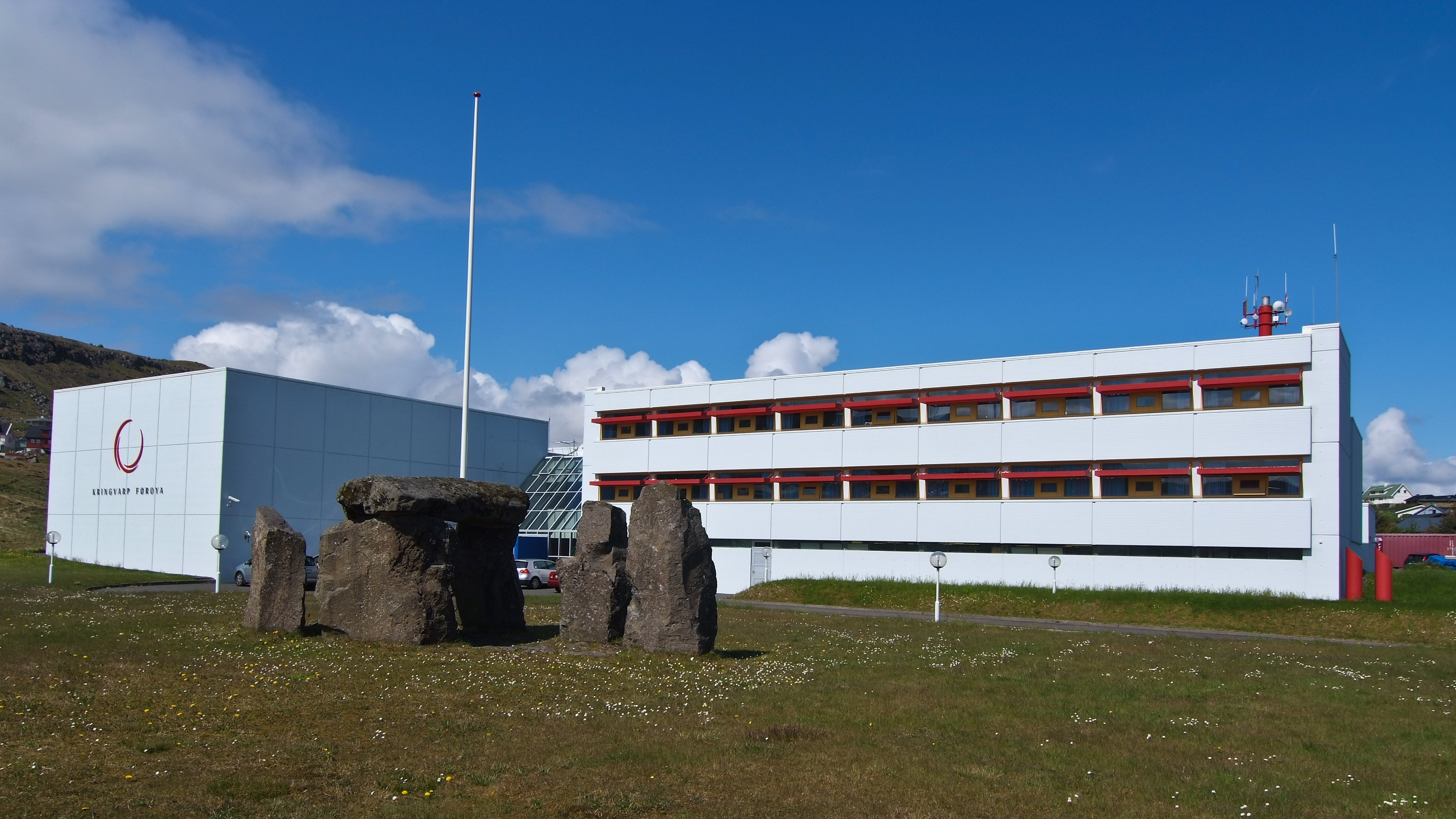
The headquarters of Kringvarp Føroya.

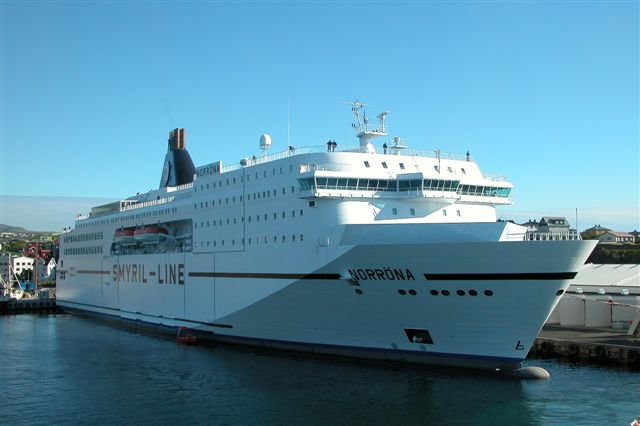
Smyril Line vessel.

== See also ==
- Economy of the Faroe Islands
- List of banks in the Faroe Islands
