= Bryggeriet Djævlebryg =

Danish microbrewery

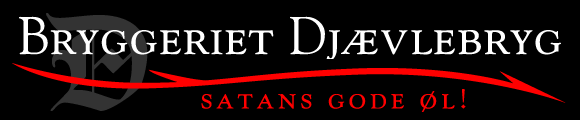
- Type: Brewery
- Headquarters: Copenhagen and Herning, Denmark
- Number of locations: 2
- Key people: Rune Lindgreen, Stinus Lindgreen, Per Olaf Huusfeldt
- Products: Beer
- Website: www.djaevlebryg.nu

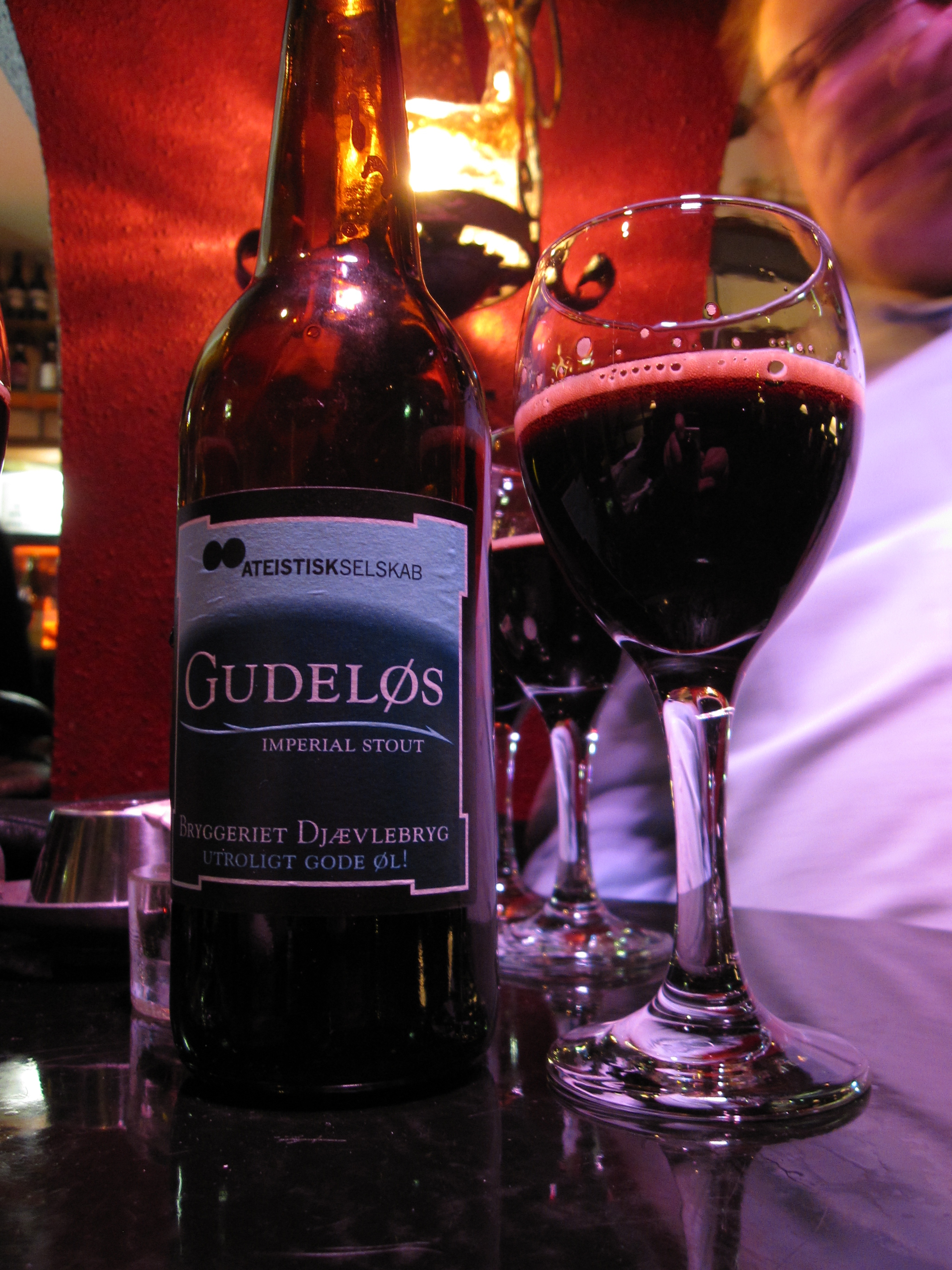
Gudeløs Imperial stout

Bryggeriet Djævlebryg (Danish: The Devil's Brew Brewery) is a Danish microbrewery established in June 2006. The brewery is a so-called phantom brewery and brews its beers at Herslev Bryghus near Roskilde. From 2006–2009 the beers were brewed at Brøckhouse in Hillerød.

== History ==
The brewery started as a hobby for the brothers Rune and Stinus Lindgreen who began to make their own beer in their mother's kitchen in 2003. After a few years of experimenting, a friend of theirs, Per Olaf Huusfeldt, suggested that they should consider establishing a microbrewery in order to expose the beers to a broader audience.

In June 2006 – on the date 06-06-06 – the brewery was formally established under the name Bryggeriet Djævlebryg Aps. Initially, brewing was carried out at the Danish microbrewery Brøckhouse, and later at the Herslev Brewery. The slogan Satans gode øl – roughly meaning 'devilishly good beers' – can be found on all bottles.

The name of the brewery plays on two things: First of all, the devil in Western mythology represents the passionate (or sinful) things in life including alcoholic beverages, and secondly, there are so many monasteries brewing beers that they need some opposition. Both the name of the brewery and the names they use for the individual beers are tongue-in-cheek.

The brewery has received quite a lot of attention from the media and respect from beer geeks worldwide. As of 2012 the brewery exports to Sweden, Finland, and the US.

== Awards ==
- At the Copenhagen Beerfestival 2007, the brewery was awarded the prize for "Best Exhibitor" by guests.
- The stout "Nekron" was voted the third best beer out of more than 550 released in Denmark in 2007.
- In 2008, "Nekron" was awarded a gold medal on the internet portal RateBeer
- Rune Lindgreen and Per Olaf Huusfeldt from Djævlebryg received the second prize and honorary mention for their exam project when graduating as diploma brewers.
- "Old Mephisto" (barleywine-style ale) won a gold medal at Stockholm Beer & Whisky Festival, 2010
- "Gudeløs" (imperial stout) won a silver medal at Stockholm Beer & Whisky Festival, 2011

== Types of beers ==
As of November 2010, the brewery sells the following beers:

- Eklipse: A pale ale. 4.5% abv.
- Mareridt ('Nightmare'): A smoked beer brewed with Brettanomyces-yeast. 6% abv.
- Hjul & Stejle ('Breaking Wheel'): A rye beer brewed with Brettanomyces-yeast. 5% abv.
- OriginAle: A double IPA brewed entirely with English hops. 8.5% abv.
- Mystikale: An ale brewed with different herbs and spices. 6.5% abv.
- Schopenhauers Vilje ('Schopenhauer's Will'): A hoppy, bitter ale named after the German philosopher Arthur Schopenhauer. 6.5% abv.
- Old Mephisto: A barleywine. 10.5% abv.
- Son of Nekron: A porter brewed with peat smoked malt. 6.5% abv.
- Nekron: A stout. 8.5% abv.
- Pride of Nekron: An imperial stout. 10.5% abv.
- Gudeløs ('Godless'): An imperial stout. 8.9% abv.

== Media coverage ==
The brewery released the imperial stout Gudeløs (meaning 'godless') at the European Beer Festival 2008. The beer is made in collaboration with the Danish Atheist Society, and the brewery donates one Danish krone to the society for each beer sold. This "atheism beer" created some discussion on the internet, even before its release, and attracted the attention of atheists worldwide. Most notably, P.Z. Myers mentioned it on his blog Pharyngula, and a thread was started on the Richard Dawkins message board discussing the beer.

The release of the Godless beer was mentioned by the Danish Beer Academy, and gave rise to a number of articles in Danish newspapers as well as a clip in the news on national Danish television. Even in Norway and as far away as USA, this beer made the news.

Before Godless was released, Djævlebryg made the news on a regular basis.
