= Off Color Brewing =

Chicago brewer of craft beer

- Industry: Alcoholic beverage
- Founded: 2013
- Founder: John Laffler & David Bleitner
- Headquarters: 3925 W. Dickens Ave. Chicago, IL 60639, USA
- Area served: Chicago metropolitan area
- Products: Beer
- Number of employees: 11
- Website: offcolorbrewing.com

Off Color Brewing is an American craft beer brewery in the Logan Square neighborhood of Chicago, Illinois. The brewery began in early 2013 as a partnership between John Laffler, formerly of Goose Island Brewery, and Dave Bleitner, formerly of Two Brothers Brewing. The modus operandi of Off Color's founders when they began operation was to focus on brewing forgotten styles of beer, particularly those made in Germany before Reinheitsgebot (i.e. the Bavarian Purity Law) was proclaimed in the late 15th century, effectively condemning myriad styles of beer not made solely with barley, water, and hops.

== Beers ==
Off Color Brewing's Current Beers
Name	Style	ABV %	IBU	Original gravity	Availability	Notes
Tooth & Claw	Dry Hopped Lager	5.0	35		Year round	The house lager of The Field Museum dry hopped with Perle hops. Good to drink in museums.
Beer for Tacos	Gose	4.5	10		Year round	Contains Lime, coriander and lactobacillus Good to drink with tacos
Apex Predator	Farmhouse Ale	6.5	35		Year round	Uses free-rise fermentation. Good to drink with people.
DinoS'mores	Imperial Stout	10.5	35		Special release	Collaboration with Amager Bryghus and West Lakeview Liquors. Brewed with graham crackers, cocoa nibs, and vanilla beans.
Very, Very Far	Mixed Fermented Belgian Style Ale	6.0	NA		Year Round	Fermented using Torulaspora delbrueckii and a Belgian ale strain of yeast, GABF Gold Medal 2019 - Other Belgian-Style Ales. Good to drink.

== See also ==
- List of microbreweries
