= Brockhouse =

Brockhouse may refer to:

- Bertram Brockhouse (1918–2003), Canadian physicist
- Brøckhouse Brewery, Denmark
- Brockhouse Corgi, see Corgi Motorcycle Co Ltd.
