= List of banks in the Faroe Islands =

== Governmental bank ==
- Landsbanki Føroya

== Commercial banks ==
- BankNordik SWIFT: FIFBFOTX
- Eik Banki SWIFT: EIKBFOTF

== Savings banks ==
- Norðoya Sparikassi SWIFT: NOYAFO21 (not connected)
- Suðuroyar Sparikassi SWIFT: SUSPFOT1 (not connected)
