= Jolly Cola =

Danish soft drink

- Type: Soft drink
- Manufacturer: Bryggeriet Vestfyen, Assens with license from Dansk Coladrik A/S
- Origin: Denmark
- Introduced: 1959; 67 years ago
- Variants: Jolly Cola, Jolly Light, Jolly Energy Cola, Jolly Time, Jolly Orange
- Website: www.jolly.dk

Jolly Cola is an original Danish soft drink dating back to 1959. Jolly is owned by the limited company 'Dansk Coladrik A/S' (Danish Coladrink Ltd). Jolly Cola is now produced by Brewery Vestfyen, which also produces Jolly Light, Jolly Time (a sports drink), and Jolly Orange.

Dansk Coladrik was founded in 1959 to compete with the American brands before they hit the Danish markets, especially Coca-Cola. Many products from the United States were copied in this way shortly before they were introduced in Denmark, so people already had a connection with the Danish brand. Dansk Coladrink is an independent company owned by the stock holders; however, Brewery Vestfyen owns a majority of stock in the company. Up until the 1980s, Jolly Cola had a market share of about 40% of the Danish cola market. This was extraordinary, as Denmark is one of a few countries in the world, where another cola than the original Coca-Cola has had a larger market share.

Jolly Cola's longtime slogan "Say Jolly to your cola!" was changed to "Free your taste" on its 50th birthday in 2009. The bottles and cans today has the slogan “EN ÆGTE DANSK ORIGINAL – SIDEN 1959”; this is translated into English as "A REAL DANISH ORIGINAL – SINCE 1959".

== History ==
Following World War II, many countries in the world viewed Coca-Cola as synonymous with the US and an American lifestyle, and as the US developed and increased its influence on society, so did Coca-Cola. In the meantime, the Danish population still had to wait until 1959 before they could buy a bottle of Coca-Cola.

Coca-Cola had been marketed with moderate success from the middle of the 1930s. However, the start of World War II was followed by both the rationing of sugar as well as a special tax on cola. This made Coca-Cola just as expensive as a beer, and kept the soft drink brand out of the Danish market. The taxation came as a result of skilled lobbyism, carried out by breweries and producers of mineral water – and it worked as intended.

Following the implementation of the tax in 1953, only 10,000 litres of cola soft drinks were sold in Denmark a year, primarily produced by minor Danish producers of mineral water, avoiding the competition from the American giant. However, the opposition against the taxation grew, and by the end of the 1950s it was only the communists and conservative powers in Danish politics, which had close connections to the brewing industry, that wanted a prohibitive surtax on what a member of the Danish Communist Party called “a bitter cup”.

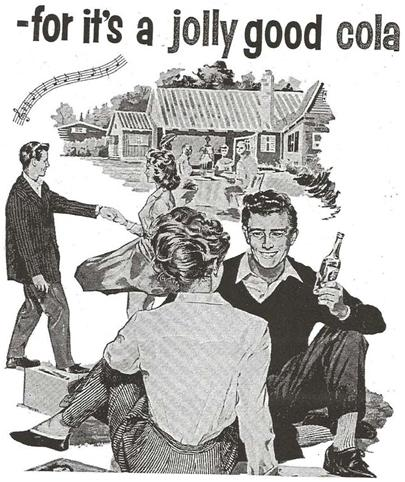
An outline of the first Jolly advertisement.

When the Danish producers finally realised that they could not keep Coca-Cola out of the Danish market anymore, they quickly changed their strategy. In January 1959 18 breweries and producers of mineral water went together to form ‘Dansk Coladrik A/S’. This initiative was instigated by Carlsberg and Tuborg so as to produce an original Danish cola that was to be sold nationwide. The soft drink was named Jolly Cola and was an all-out copy product. This regarded not only the taste, but also the organisation behind the product, which completely resembled Coca-Cola, especially in terms of having a strong and centralised control of quality and marketing, combined with local bottling departments. Suddenly, the strategy seemed to be that if you could not get rid of Coca-Cola, the least you could do was to ensure that the Danish population drank Danish produced cola. To a great extent, this was a success, and when the taxation was removed and ‘the great Danish cola war’ broke out in July 1959, Jolly Cola actually conquered a significant part of the new market.

In July 1959 alone, nine million bottles of Jolly Cola were sold, compared to five million bottles of Coca-Cola. This was an incredible number compared to an annual sale of 40 to 50,000 bottles in 1958. Naturally, the sheer interest of the news explains a part of the increased sale, but so does the summer of 1959, which was exceptionally good. Nevertheless, when the market finally stabilised, roughly every fifth sold soft drink in Denmark was a cola, and approximately 40% was Jolly Cola.

Jolly Cola maintained this market share until the 1980s.

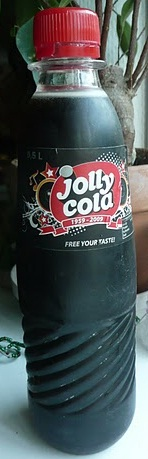
A photograph of a bottle of Jolly Cola taken in 2010.

There are several explanations for Jolly Cola’s success. However, the most important one is that ‘Dansk Coladrik’ could make use of the brewing industry’s comprehensive network, distributing system and knowledge of the Danish market. Another reason is that it was only possible to buy Coca-Cola in Copenhagen and a few larger cities in Jutland in the early years of the hectic ‘cola war’. Hence, it was not until the 1960s that it was possible to buy Coca-Cola nationwide. This ensured that Jolly Cola was a well-established product in many places when Coca-Cola finally ventured into the market. Thirdly, it was due to great marketing. Dansk Coladrik had tapped their cola in regular soft drink bottles. This made it easier for the retail industry to administer the returnable bottle system, but it also made it possible to launch Jolly Cola as “The Big Cola” (a slogan that not coincidentally resembled Pepsi’s successful 1930s US slogan for its big 12 ounce bottle). A Danish soft drink bottle contained exactly 25 cl, whereas the characteristic ‘chubby’ Coca-Cola bottle only contained 19 cl. The argument about value for your money was important in a time where a soft drink was considered to be a luxury product. (The story of Jolly Cola is based on the work of Klaus Petersen and Niels Arne Sørensen from the Institute of History, Culture and Society).

== Today’s Jolly Cola ==
In the 1980s, Jolly Cola still had around 60% of the Danish cola market. However, in the 1990s, the brand had experienced a decrease in sales. In 1999, the failing sales numbers forced the Danish Consumers Cooperative Society (Coop amba) to remove Jolly Cola from its shelves. Following this, Jolly Cola only made up 6% of the total Danish soft drink market in 2002, which was again reduced to 2% in 2003. In the same year, a trial between the brewery Vestfyen and the association of Danish breweries almost compromised Jolly Cola’s existence. Vestfyen believed that the association of Danish breweries would rather market Pepsi Cola at the expense of Jolly Cola. In September 2003, however, Vestfyen took over all stocks dealing with the struggling soft drink so as to engage in a turn-around of the product. This became an immense success, and in 2004 Jolly Cola made up 25% of Coop amba's cola sales.

In 2001, Föroya Bjór, a brewer and soft drink producer in the Faroe Islands, bought the rights to of the brand name and has continued to produce Jolly Cola.

== Labels ==
Jolly’s labels have changed a couple of times during the years. However, what they have in common is a retro design. It is the same look/design which is reappearing in the new logo. In the 1980s and 1990s, there were quizzes, crossword puzzles and common proverbs on the back of Jolly’s labels.

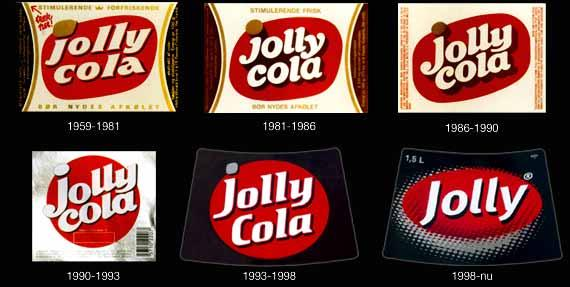
Jolly labels through time.

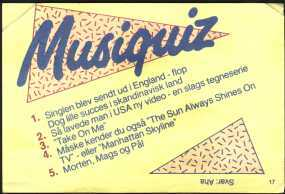
Jolly music quiz from the 1980s.

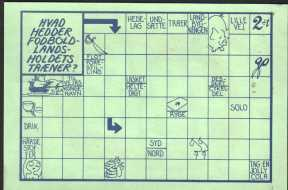
Jolly crossword puzzle.
