= Odin Brewery =

Brewery in Viborg, Denmark, 1832–1988

- Interactive map of Odin Brewery
- Location: Viborg, Denmark
- Opened: 1832
- Closed: 1988

Odin Brewery was a brewery in Viborg, Denmark which existed from 1832 to 1988; at that time it was the oldest brewery in Denmark.

In February 2019 a small amount of Odin beers from 1906 were discovered under the old brewery.
