= Bryggeriet Vestfyen A/S =

Danish beverage company

- Industry: Beverages
- Founded: 1885
- Headquarters: Assens, Denmark
- Products: Beers, water and lagers
- Net income: 183.324.000 DKK (2011)
- Website: https://bryggeriet-vestfyen.dk/

Bryggeriet Vestfyen A/S is a Danish beverage company established in 1885.

== Brands ==
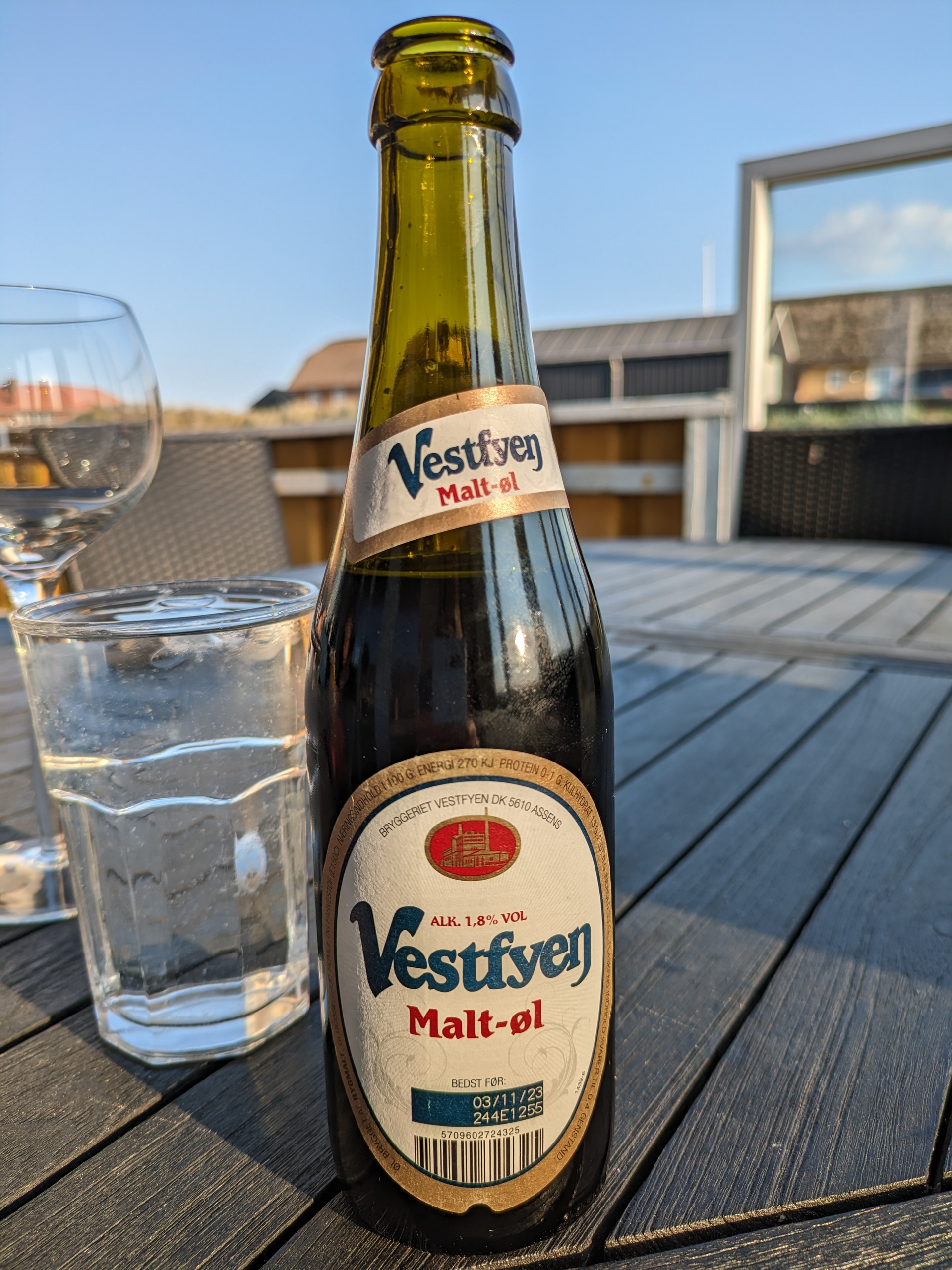
A bottle of Vestfyen Malt-Øl.

Brands held by the Bryggeriet Vestfyen:

- Willemoes Ale
- Willemoes Stout
- Vestfyen Ren Pilsner
- Vestfyen Pilsner
- Vestfyen Classic
- Willemoes Strong Lager
- Willemoes Porter
- Willemoes Høstbryg
- Willemoes Påskebryg
- Willemoes Påske Ale
- Willemoes Jule Ale
- Willemoes Julebryg
- Willemoes Classic
- Nat-expressen
- Pale Ale
- Prins Kristian
- Danish Pride
- Påskebryg
- Julebryg
- Vestfyen Light Pilsner
- Prima Hvidtøl

== Soda-Water ==
- Jolly Cola
