= Thisted Bryghus =

Danish brewery

A/S Thisted Bryghus

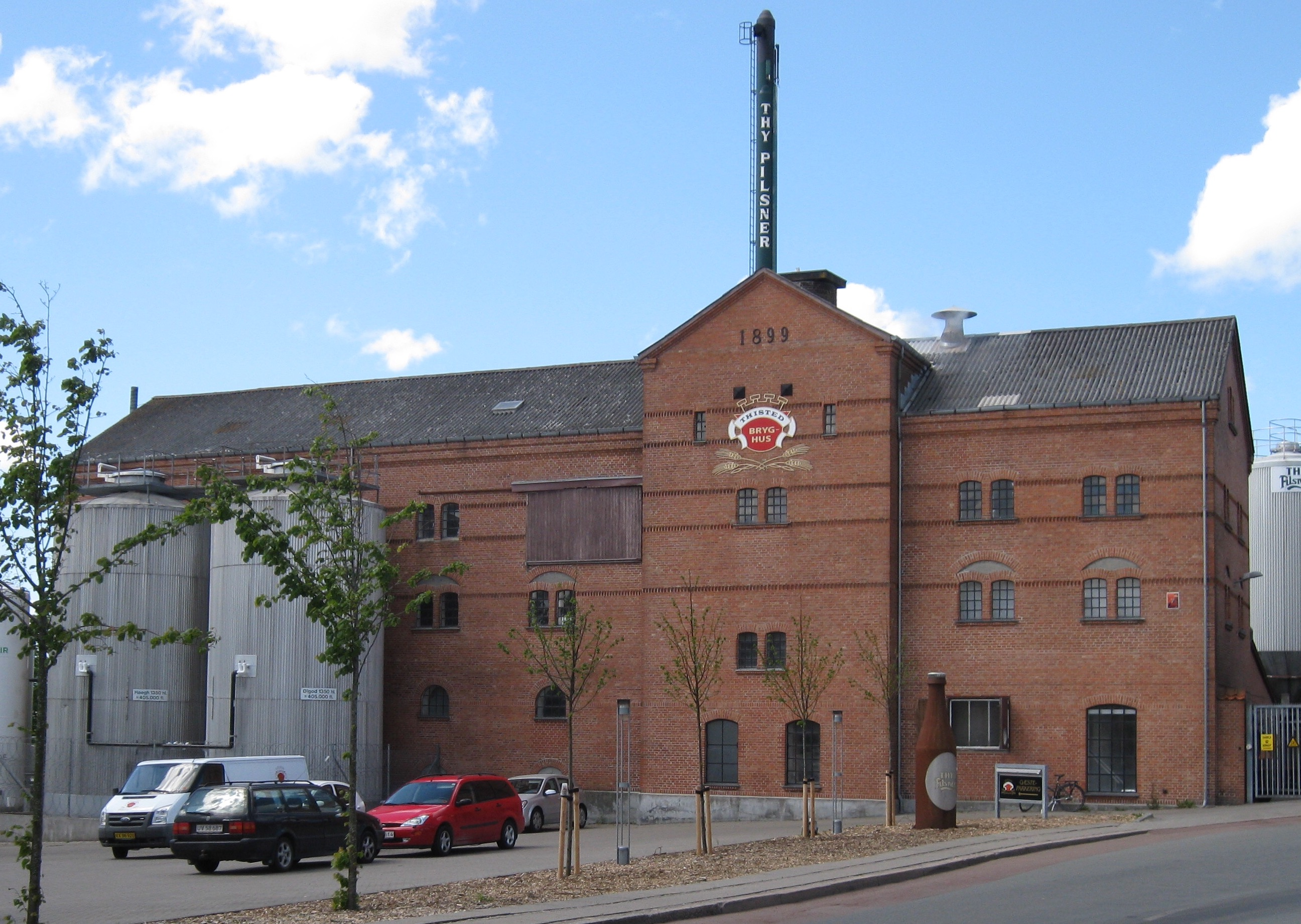
- Thisted Brewery in 2012
- Industry: Brewing
- Founded: 1902
- Headquarters: Thisted, Denmark
- Number of employees: 21
- Website: Thisted-bryghus.dk

Thisted Brewery (Danish: Thisted Bryghus) is a regional brewery in Thisted in the north of Denmark founded in 1902. The brewery supplies the local market with pilsner beer, and has gained recognition internationally for beers like Porse Guld (spiced with bog myrtle) and Limfjords Porter, a Baltic porter.

In 1995, Thisted Bryghus was the first Danish brewery to introduce organic beer.

In 2015, Thisted Brewery was named "Brewery of the Year" by the 9,000 members of the Danish beer enthusiasts association, Danske Ølentusiaster.

In 2019, the company invested 30 million kroner in a new brewery in Thisted.

== Limfjords Porter ==
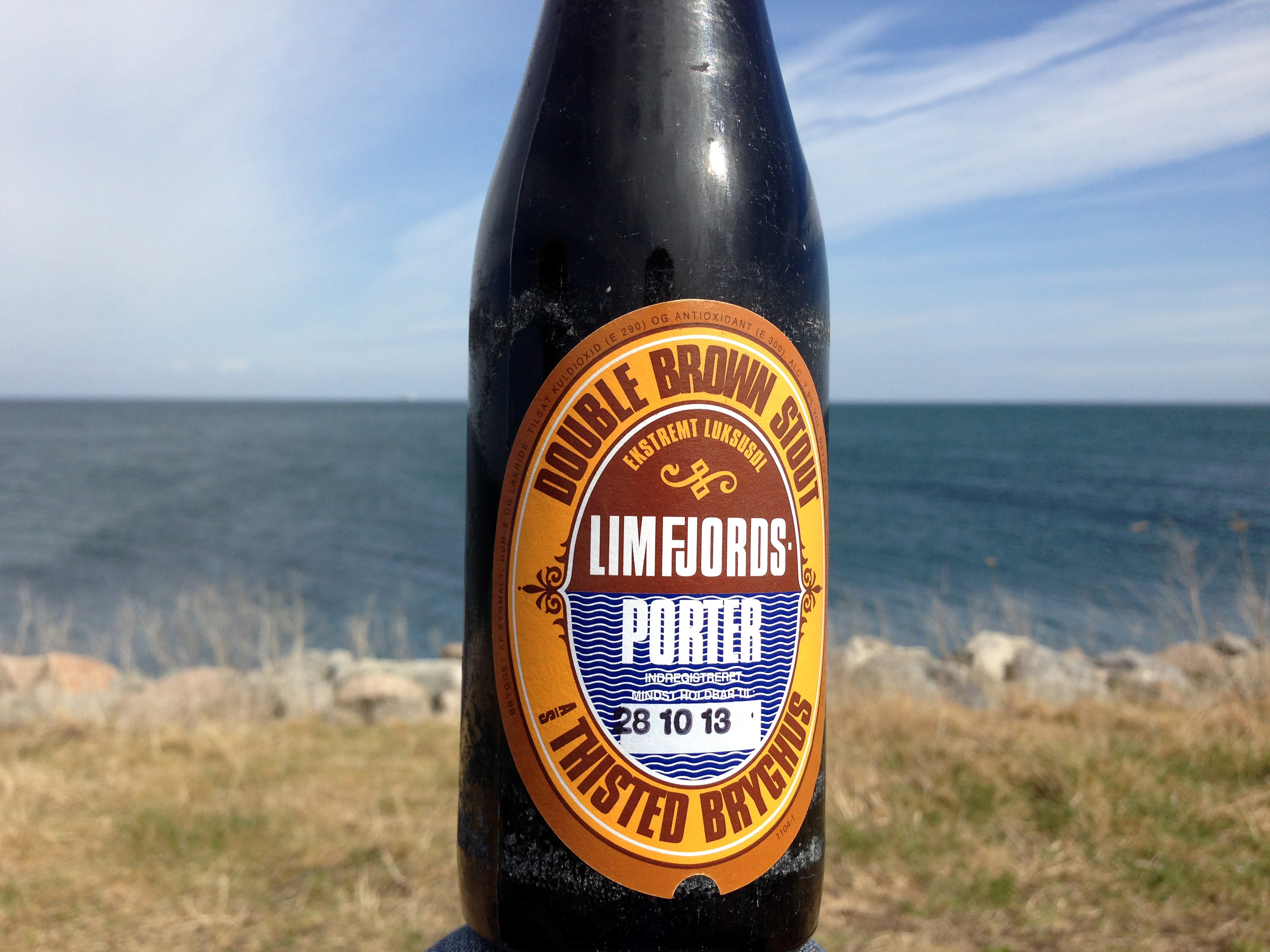
A bottle of Limfjords Porter

Twentieth century beer writer Michael Jackson wrote of Thisted's Limfjords Porter:

"It was full of character: a dense, brownish, head over a slatey, black, brew; full-bodied and lightly oily; a touch of burnt-grass, rooty, peatiness; a long, warming, finish; and an alcohol content of 7.9. The flavours were very complex, and I was not surprised to hear that both smoked malt and licorice were used."

In 2016, Thisted Brewery produced a "beer geek" version of Limfjords Porter in cooperation with international craft brewer, Mikkeller.
