= Föroya Bjór =

Faroese brewing company

Coordinates: 62.2321°N 6.5965°W

- Industry: Alcoholic beverage, soft drink
- Founded: Klaksvík (1888)
- Headquarters: Klaksvík, Faroe Islands
- Area served: Faroe Islands; Iceland; Denmark
- Products: Beer, soft drink
- Owner: Einar Waag
- Website: www.bjor.fo

Föroya Bjór is a Faroese brewing company based in Klaksvík. Apart from beers the company also produces soft drinks. It was established in 1888 in Klaksvík.

== History ==
In 1883 Símun F. Hansen went to Denmark to learn the art of brewing and baking. Upon his return in the Faroe Islands in 1888, he established his own brewery in Klaksvík, the second to be established in the country. The first brewery was Restorffs Bryggjarí.

The brewery was founded in 1888 by Símun í Vági (1863–1935). This makes Föroya Bjór one of the oldest companies in the Faroe Islands. When Símun í Vági went to Denmark in 1883 to become a baker, he also learned to brew beer. In 1888 he started businesses with a bakery, brewery, shipping company and agriculture. At that time it was the second brewery on the islands (the first was Restorffs Bryggjarí).

Símun í Vági´søn Einar Fróvin Waag (1894–1989), expanded the brewery in the 1950s and 1960s, and was for a period a member of the Lagting.

His sons Einar and Heini Waag each owned half of the company until December 2008, when Heini Waag chose to sell his share to Einar Waag (1947–), who is now the sole owner of Föroya Bjór. His daughter Annika Waag is employed as company manager and brewmaster.

From mid-2005, Föroya Bjór took over the production of soft drinks from Restorffs Bryggjarí, which had been closed since 2007.

In 2009 Föroya Bjór opened an office in Reykjanesbær and started exporting its products in Iceland.

In 2016, the first bottle of Einar's Akvavit came on the market, and in October of the same year it was followed by whiskey.

On 18 June 2020, Föroya Bjór bought the Okkara Brewery at Velbastaður.

== Name and symbol ==
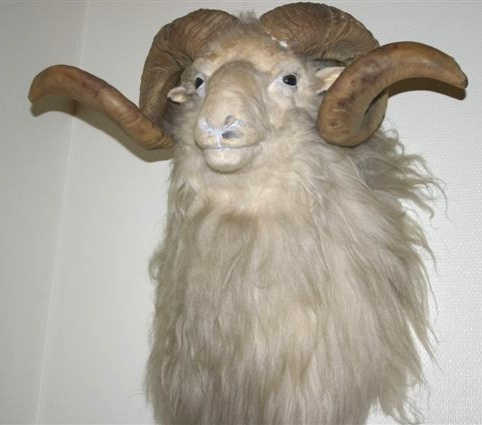
Föroya Bjór has a ram as its symbol.

The name of the brewery means The Beer of the Faroes. The ram is the symbol of Föroya Bjór since its establishment.

== Product line ==
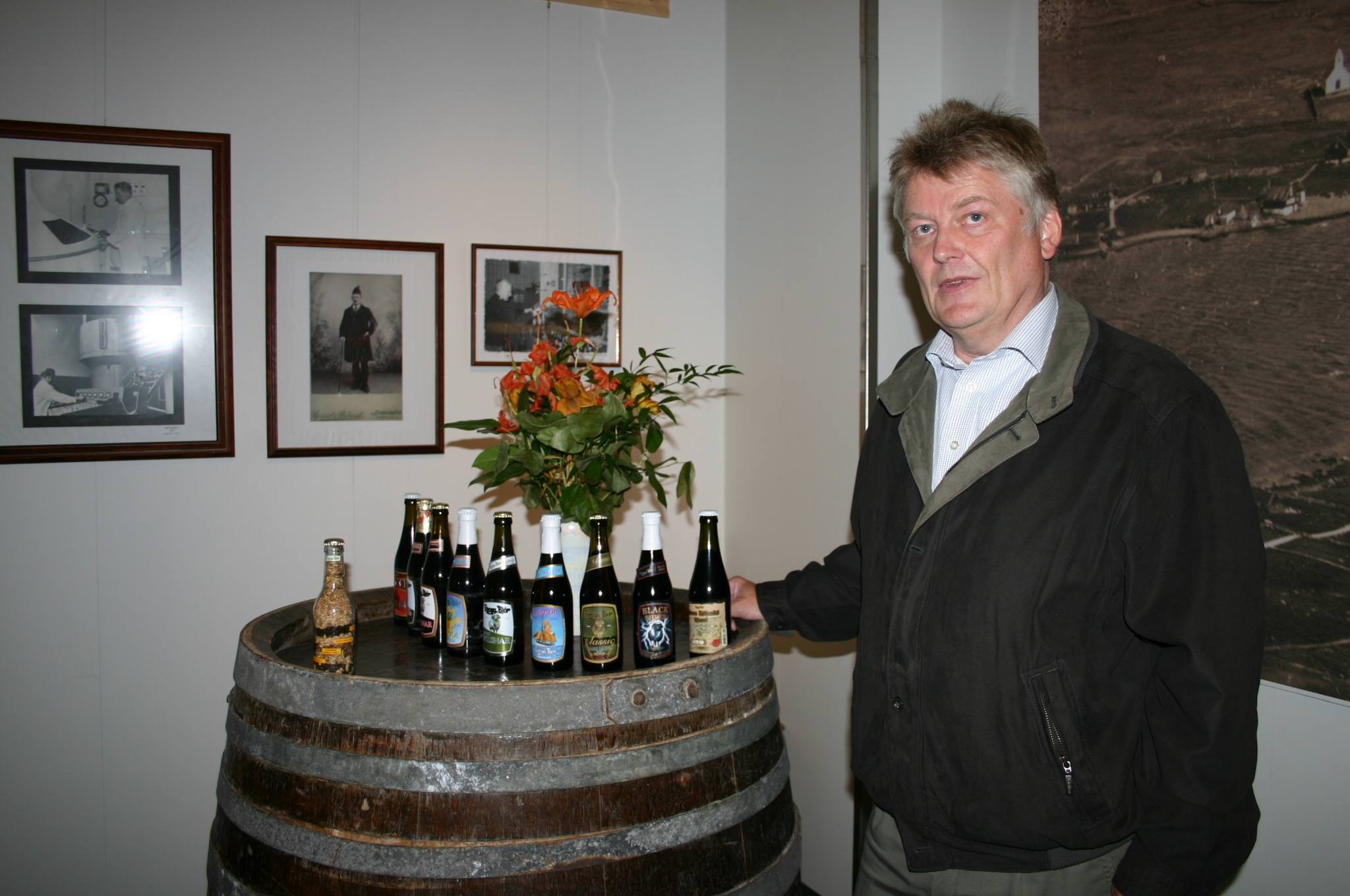
Föroya Bjór boss Einar Waag

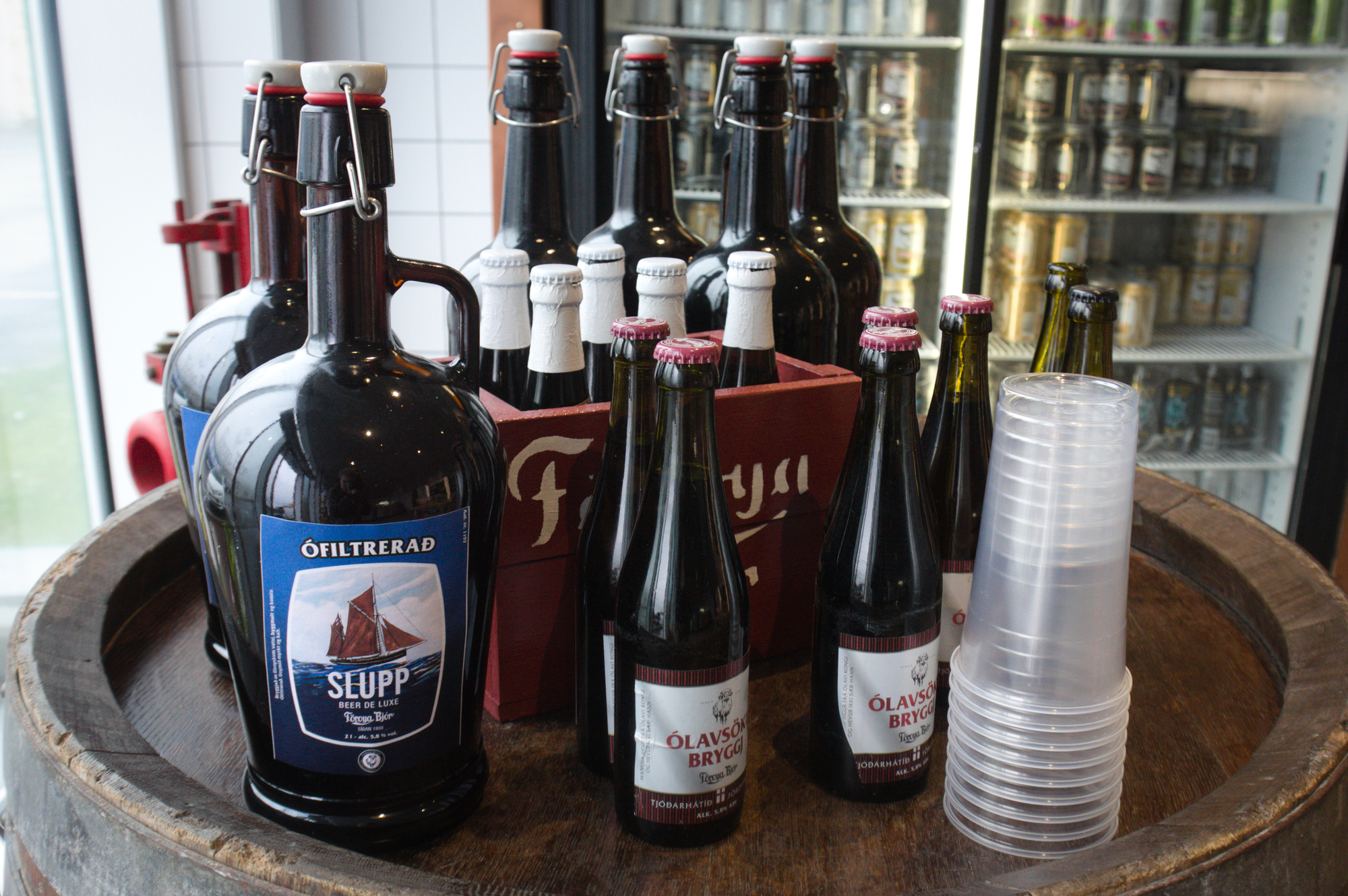
Beer bottles of Føroya Bjór

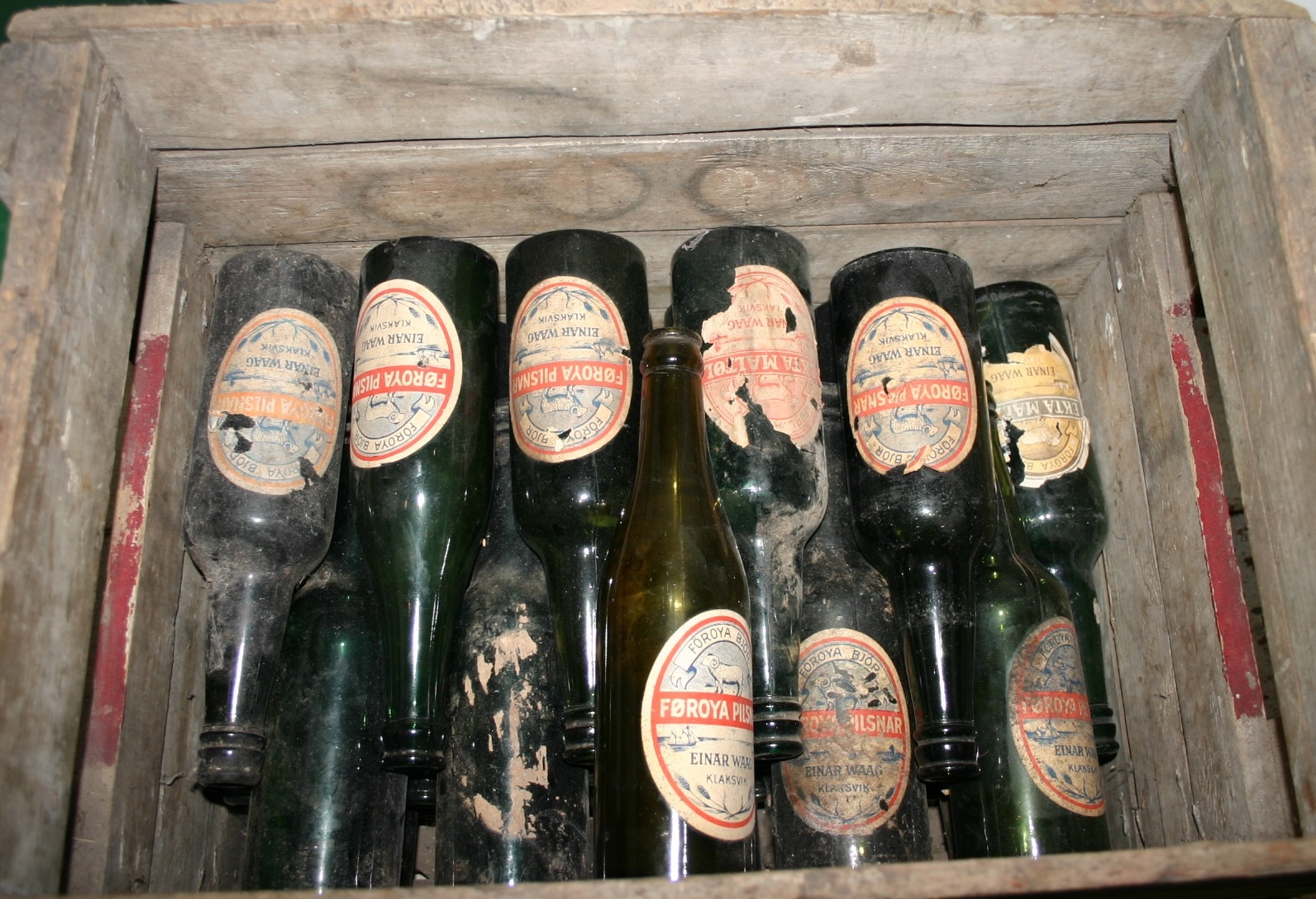
Old Faroese beer bottles

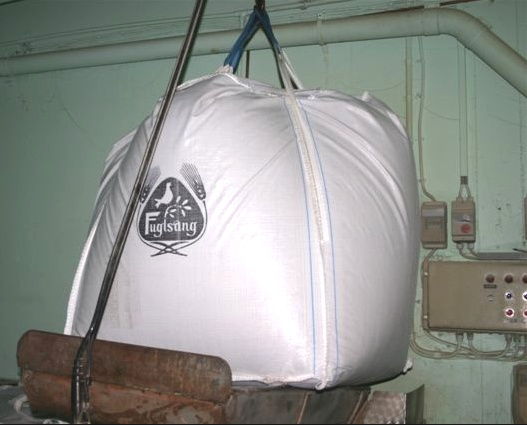
Fuglsang malt at Föroya Bjór

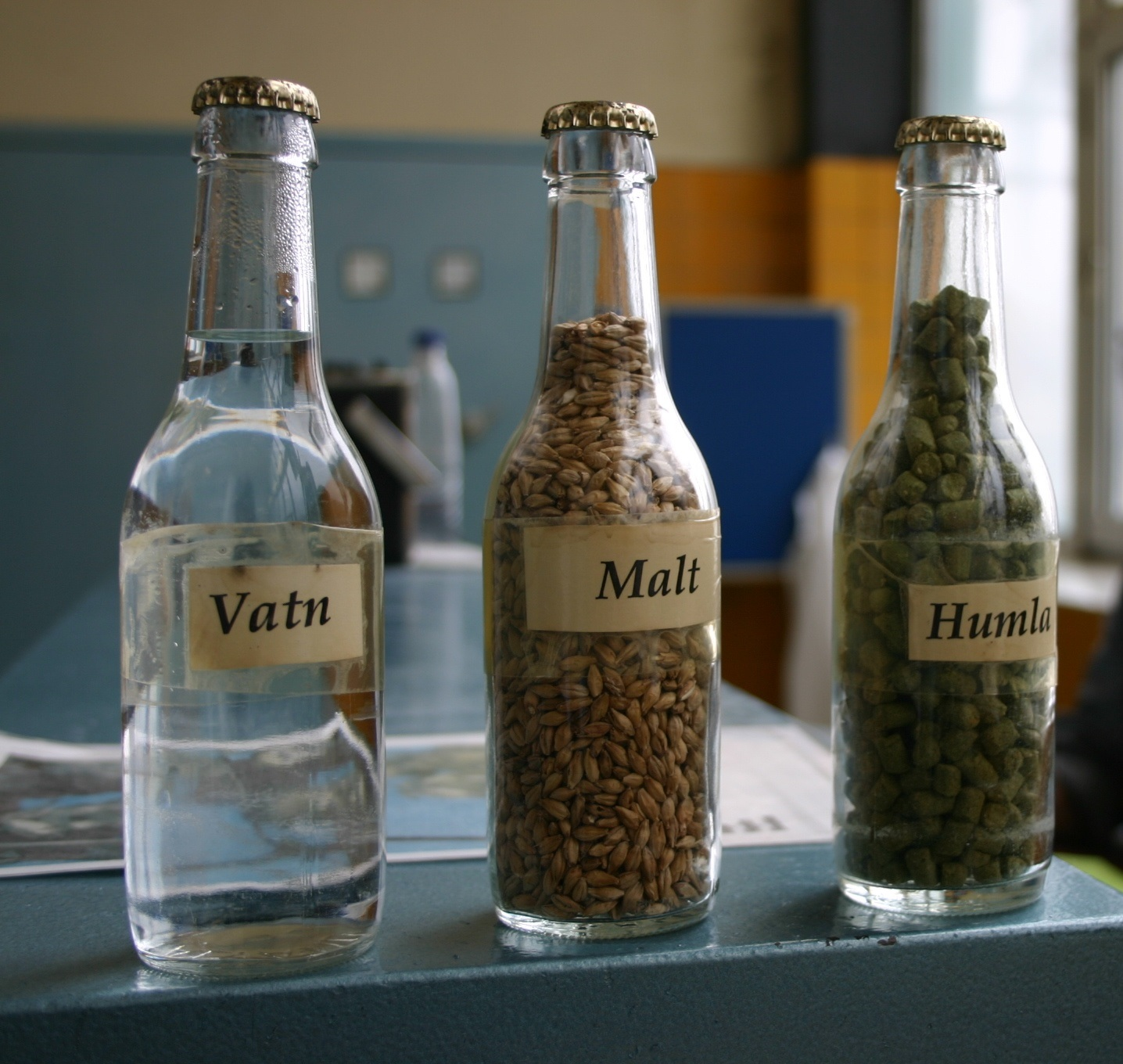
Ingredents of Faroese beer
- Veðrur – 4.6% A pilsner with a combination of malt and hops.
- Gold Export Lager – 5.8% A fruity flavour, balanced with a combination of malt and hop flavour.
- Jólabryggj – 5.8%
- Páskabryggj – 5.8%
- Ljóst Pilsnar – 2,7.%
- Maltöl – (malt beer) is under 2% abv, and quite malty and sweet.
- Jólaöl – (literally Christmas beer) is a dark, sweet maltöl (white beer) which is sold around Christmas time.
- Sluppöl – 5.8% An amber-coloured beer with malt, caramel and first-class hops taste (1984).
- Black Sheep – 5.8% A dark all-malt lager. Caramel, hops and roasted malt flavours (2001).
- Classic – 4.6% A dark pilsner with malt- and caramel flavour, balanced with first-class hops (2002).
- Rockall Brown Ale – 5.8%. Brewed with the English variety East Kent Golding of Noble hops (2006).
- Rockall Wheat Beer (2006)
- X-mas 1888 – 5.8% (2007)
- Green Islands Stout – 5.8% A dark beer with a sweet and bitter aroma. Brewed with a touch of coffee, liquorice and chocolate notes (2008).
- Green Islands Special – 5.8% (2008)
- Sct. Brigid Ale – 4.6% An amber-coloured ale brewed with a selection malts and hops (2008).
- Sct. Brigid Abbey Ale – 5.8% Abbey ale / Belgian dubbel
- Sct. Brigid Boheme (2008)
- Sct. Brigid Blond (2008)
- Sct. Brigid IPA (2008).

Taken over from Restorffs Bryggjarí:

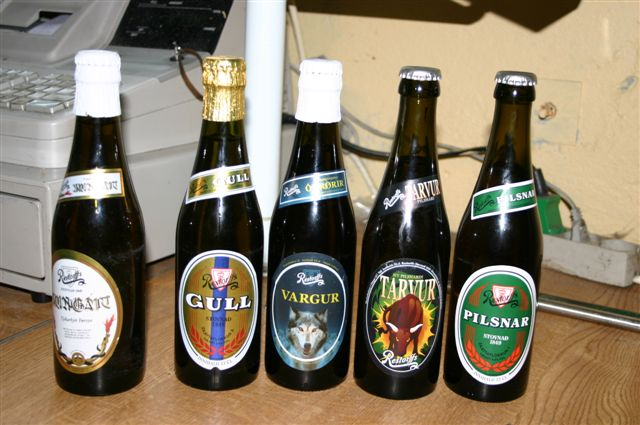
Some of the beers from Restorffs Bryggjarí, now made at Föroya Bjór
- Jóla Gull 5.7% alc. vol.
- Jólatrøllið (2002) 5.7% alc. vol.: Replaced Jóla Gull.
- Jóla Øl
- Mungát (2002): 5.7% alc. vol.
- Ólavsøku Gull 5.7% alc. vol. Brewed for the Faroese national day on 29 July, Ólavsøka, to commemorate Olav the Holy (Olav II) of Norway, who died in battle on 29 July 1030. He Christianized the Faroe Islands in the 11th century. 29 July is also the day when the Faroese lagting opens to begin a new lagting year.
- Páska Bryggj 5.7% alc. vol.
- Restorffs Gull 5.7% alc. vol. The brewery's best-selling beer.
- Restorff's Pilsnar (2002) 4.6% alc. vol.: Replaced Silvur.
- Silver, 4.6% alc. vol.: Light pilsner beer.
- Cormorant, 5.7% alc. vol.: Half dark golden beer.
- Tarvur Nýpilsnar (2002) 4.6% alc. vol.: Replaced Silvur.
- Skansa Beer, 4.6% alc. vol: Half dark pilsner beer.
- Vargur (2002) 5.7% alc. Vol.
- Víkingur: light lager.

=== Soda ===
- Jolly Cola – Jolly Light – Jolly Cola Sugar Free Zero – Water – Apollinaris – Apollinaris Citrus & Lime – Orange – Citrón – Citrus LIGHT – Ginger Ale – Hawaii Dream – Raspberry – Jolly Time – Jolly Time Sugar Free – Sport Water – Sqviiz – Tonic Water – Jolly Cola Sugar Free – Jolly Orange Sugar Free – Jolly Lemon – Jolly Apricot – Jolly Tonic Sugar Free – Jolly Ginger Beer Sugar Free – Jolly Rose Lemonade Sugar Free.
- Taken over from Restorffs Bryggjarí: Peru Drink – Sisu – Apollinaris – Apollo – HAWAII Dream: Pineapple – ASSU: Orange – Club Soda – Raspberry – Kola – Sport Water.
- Pepsi Cola under license.

== Gallery ==
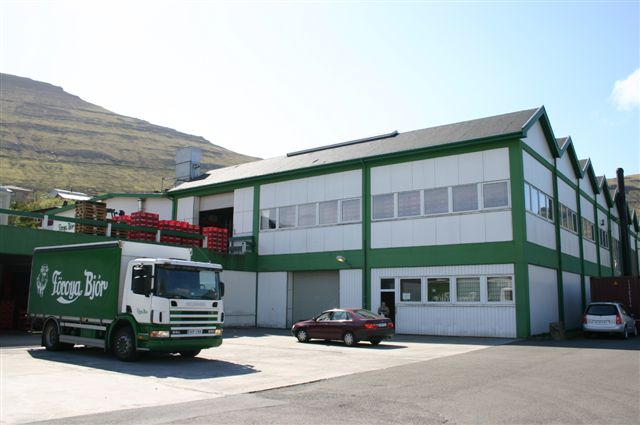

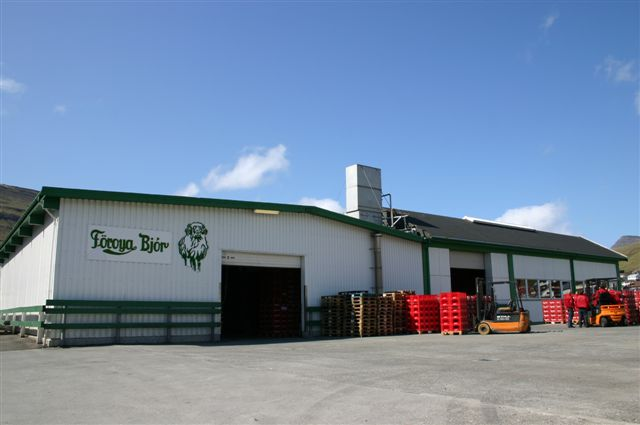
The company's factory in Klaksvík

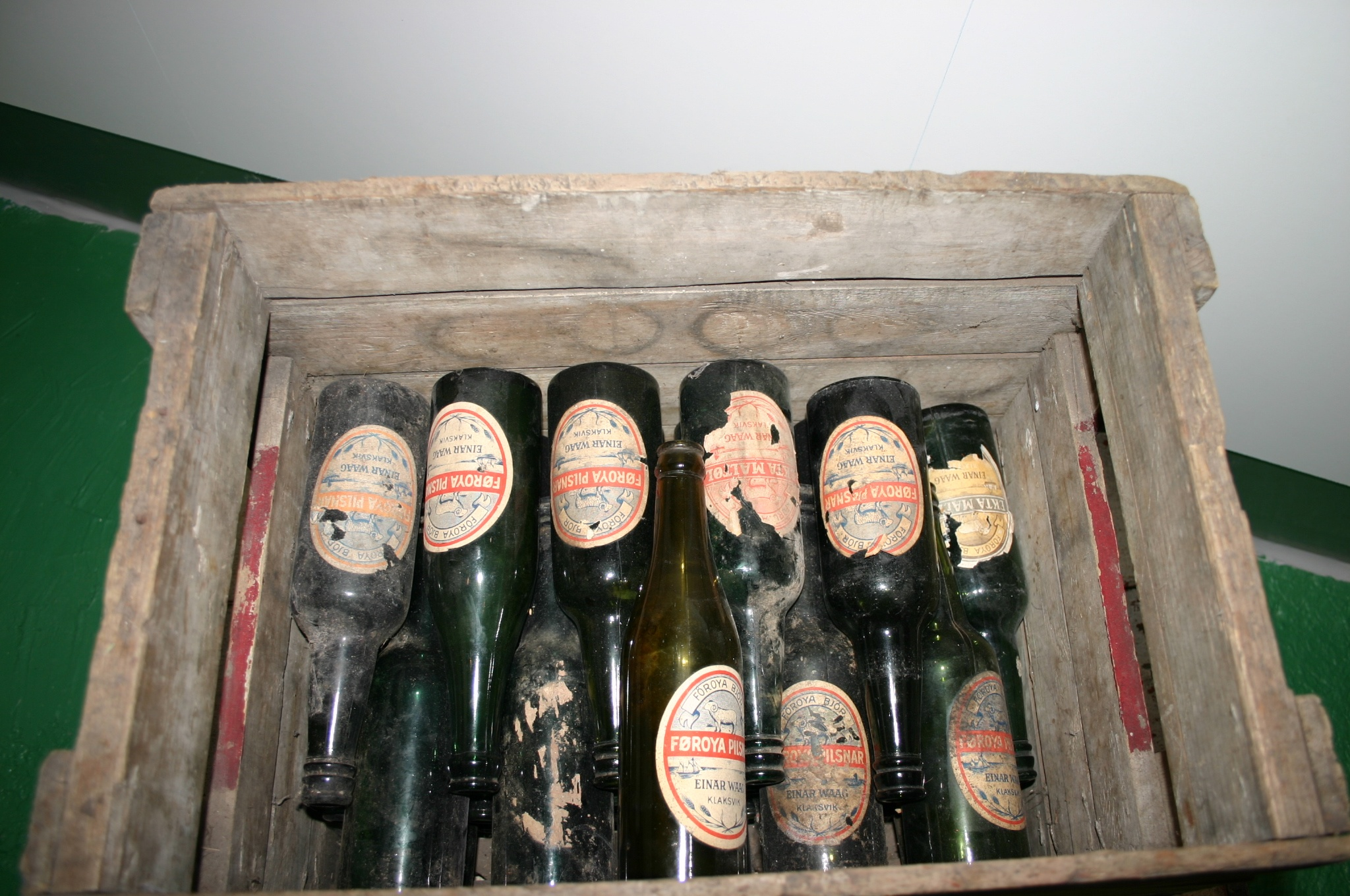
Old beer bottles

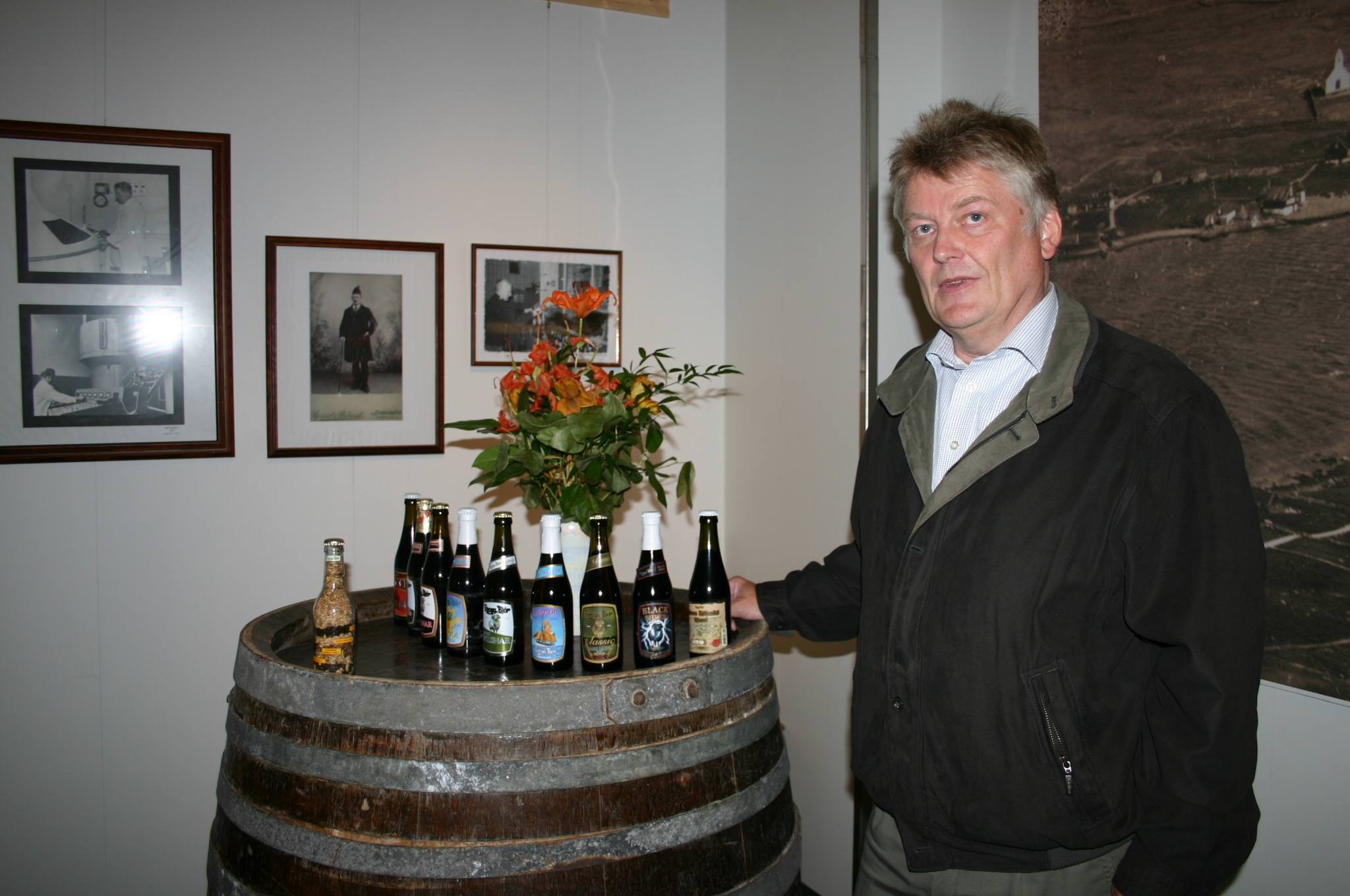
Föroya Bjór boss Einar Waag

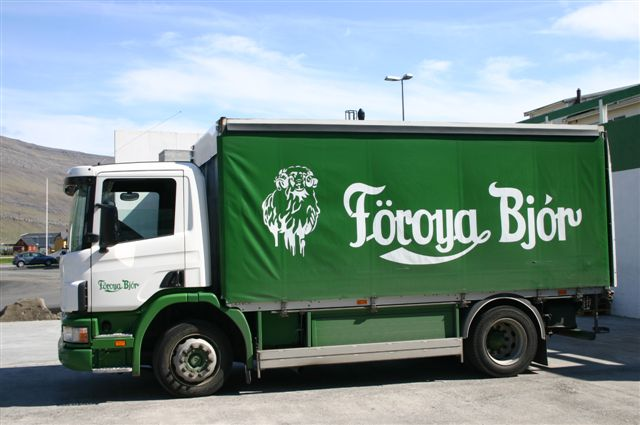
Truck of Föroya Bjór

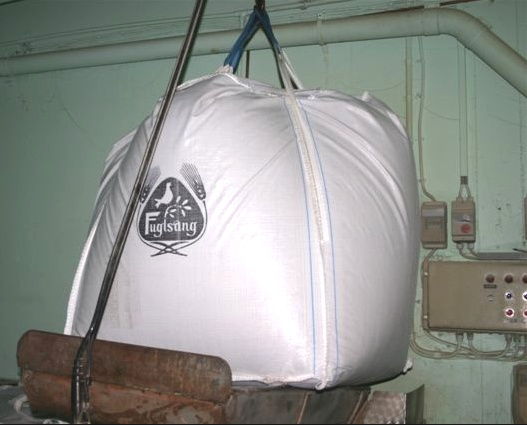
Fuglsang malt at Föroya Bjór

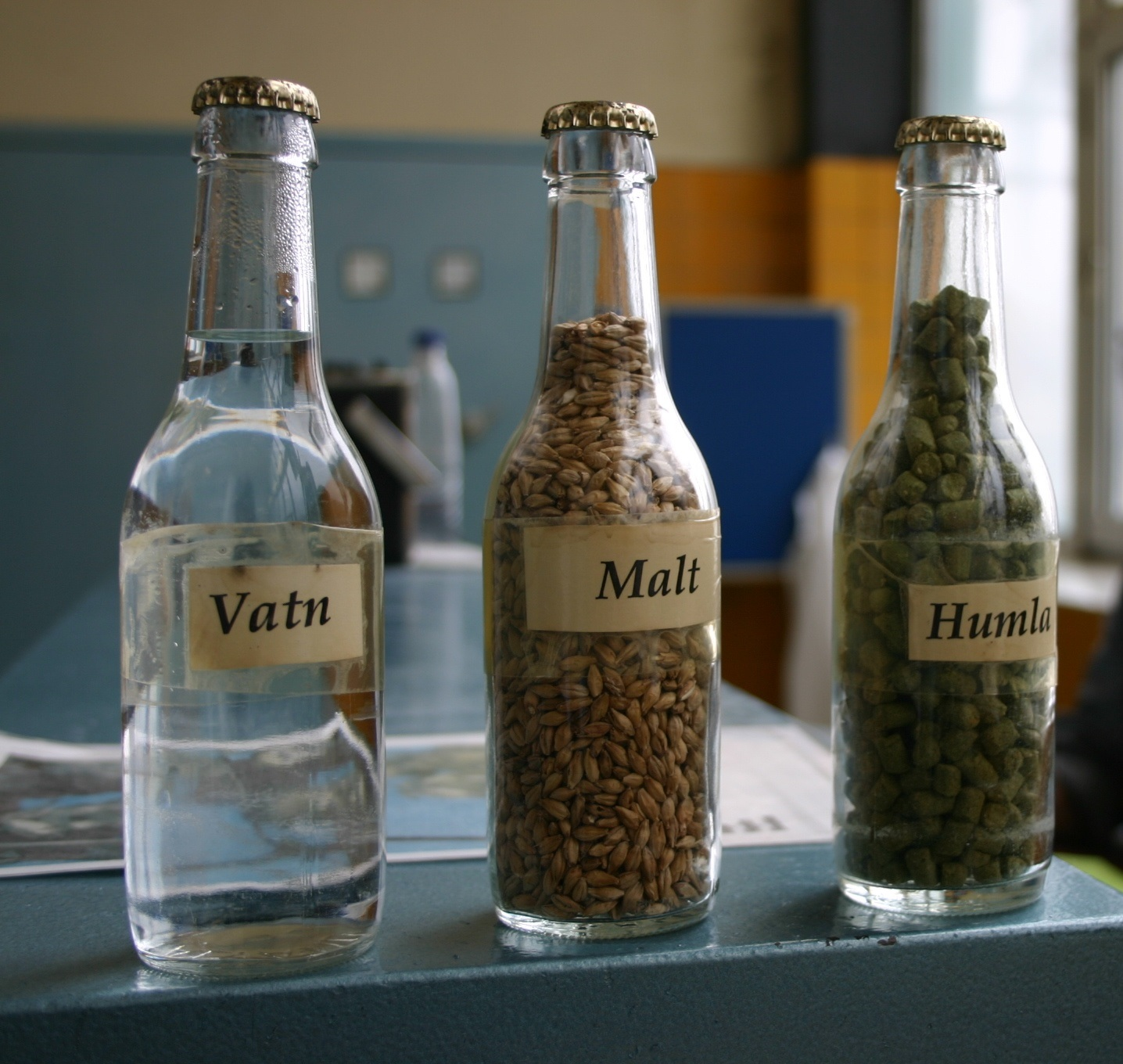
Ingredents of Faroese beer

== See also ==
- Economy of the Faroe Islands
- List of companies of the Faroe Islands
