= Danish Atheist Society =

Danish association for atheists and non-believers

The Danish Atheist Society (Danish: Ateistisk Selskab "the Atheist Society") is a Danish association for non-believers. The purpose of the association is to be a community for non-believers, to work for a complete separation of church and state, to educate the public about atheism and thereby reduce prejudices against atheists, to encourage people to think critically and independently about life and existence, and to spread a naturalistic worldview founded upon science and critical thinking.

== Campaign to encourage Danes to leave the Church of Denmark ==
In March 2016, the association started a campaign with billboards to encourage Danes to leave the Church of Denmark. They also started a website with information about how to leave the church.
