= Evil Twin Brewing =

Gypsy brewery in Denmark

- Industry: Brewing
- Founded: 2010
- Founder: Jeppe Jarnit-Bjergsø
- Headquarters: Copenhagen, Denmark and Ridgewood, Queens, New York, United States
- Area served: Copenhagen, Scotland, United States; Multinational (distribution)
- Products: Beer
- Website: http://eviltwin.dk/

Evil Twin Brewing is a gypsy brewery originating in Denmark. Founded in 2010 by Jeppe Jarnit-Bjergsø. Evil Twin Brewing started as a gypsy brewery, in that the company does not operate an official brewery but instead collaborates with other brewers to produce their limited-edition and one-off beers, as well as a series of seasonal and year-round beers available internationally. In January 2019 Evil Twin Brewing opened their first brick and mortar brewery in Ridgewood, Queens, New York City. A tap room opened at the same location on October 2, 2019.

Jarnit-Bjergsø, a former schoolteacher in Copenhagen, is also the proprietor of Drikkeriget in Copenhagen, which imports and distributes craft beer throughout Europe, and a bar in Brooklyn called Tørst, which serves Evil Twin and other craft beers. He is also the co-author of a book titled Food & Beer with chef Daniel Burns, who ran a Michelin-starred restaurant called Luksus that shared space with Tørst.
