= Jacobsen (beer) =

Beer brand

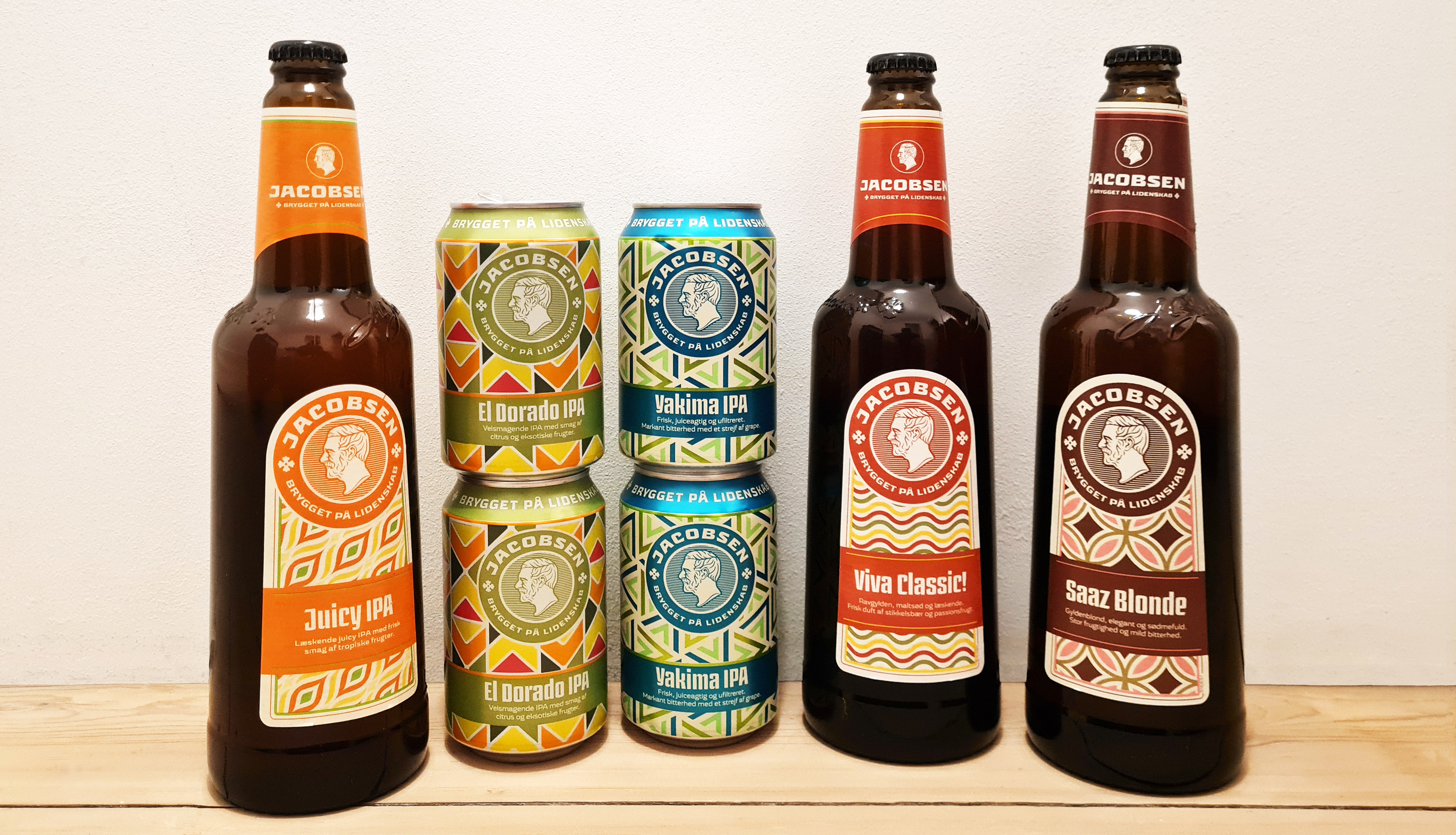
Husbryggeriet Jacobsen Jacobsen beer collection
- Location: Copenhagen, Denmark
- Opened: 2005
- Owned by: Carlsberg

Active beers
Name	Type
Jacobsen Bramley Whit	Belgian Wheat Beer
Jacobsen Brown Ale	Brown Ale
Jacobsen Camomile Dubbel	Dubbel Ale
Jacobsen Extra Pilsner	Luxury Pilsner
Jacobsen Original Dark Lager	Münich, Dunkel
Jacobsen Saaz Blonde	Pale Ale

Seasonal beers
Name	Type
Jacobsen Golden Naked Christmas Ale	Dubbel Ale

Other beers
Name	Type
Jacobsen Husbryg	Varies

Jacobsen is an upscale brand of specialty beers owned by Carlsberg. Named after Carlsberg's founder, J.C. Jacobsen, it is housed in the original Carlsberg brewery in Valby in Copenhagen, Denmark and is currently headed by Head Brewer Bjarke Bertelsen.

== History ==
The Jacobsen Brewhouse (Husbryggeriet Jacobsen in Danish) officially opened on 31 May 2005. Its creation was intended to spearhead Carlsberg's renewed focus on specialty beers in response to the growing market segment sparked by the microbrewery movement. The brewery currently has an annual production capacity of 1,700,000 litres (equal to 5 million 330 ml bottles), but has the potential of doubling in size to 3,500,000 litres. Originally only available in Denmark, Jacobsen has now expanded its distribution to limited areas in Norway, Sweden, Finland, and the United States.

== Product line ==
The original launch for Jacobsen included four beers:

- Jacobsen Bramley Whit—A Belgian style wheat beer flavored with Bramley apples.
- Jacobsen Brown Ale—An English inspired ale.
- Jacobsen Original Dark Lager—Based on J.C. Jacobsen's original recipe from 1854.
- Jacobsen Saaz Blonde—A Belgian inspired pale ale.

Several other beers have been introduced since then:

- Jacobsen Camomile Dubbel—A double ale with a hint of chamomile.
- Jacobsen Extra Pilsner—A "luxury" pilsner with high-quality ingredients.
- Jacobsen Golden Naked Christmas Ale—A specially spiced beer only available during the holiday season.
- Jacobsen Husbryg—Every year the brewmaster creates 3-4 'House brews' that are available for only a limited time at the brewery itself. The current Husbryg is Nordisk Sommer Ale.
- Jacobsen Juicy IPA
