= Betri Banki =

Financial services group in the Faroe Islands

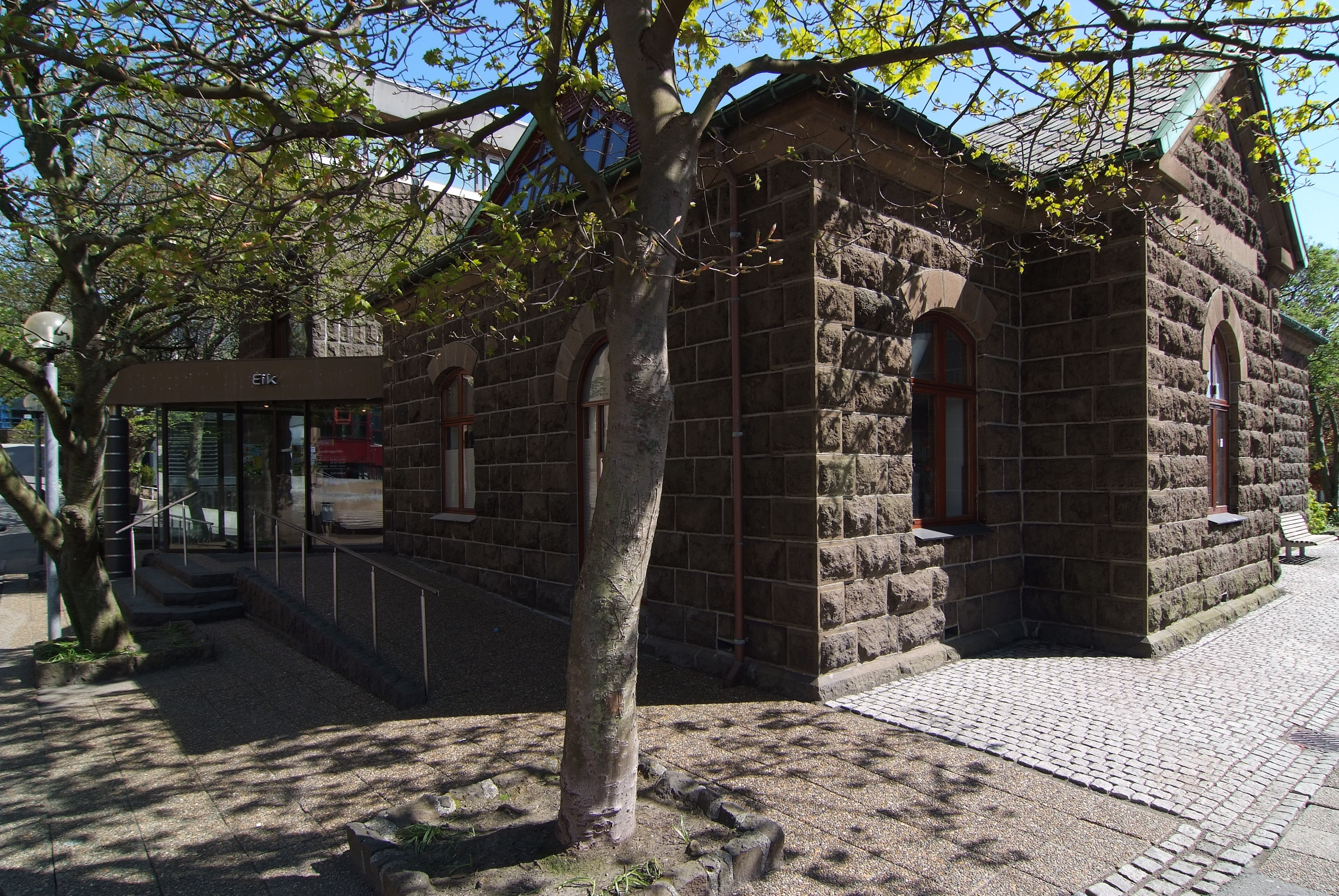
- Branch in Tórshavn
- Company type: Partafelag (state-owned)
- Industry: Financial services
- Founded: 1832
- Headquarters: Tórshavn, Faroe Islands
- Key people: Torben Nielsen (Chairman), Súni Schwartz Jacobsen (CEO)
- Products: Banking, investment management
- Net income: ▼ (DKK 297.3 million) (2009)
- Total assets: DKK 21.59 billion (2009)
- Total equity: DKK 1.344 billion (2009)
- Number of employees: 330 (FTE, 2009)
- Website: www.betri.fo

Betri Banki (formerly Føroya Sparikassi and Eik Banki) is a financial services group in the Faroe Islands, which was previously one of the two major privately owned banking firms based in the country. Established in 1832, the group, which also operated in mainland Denmark, encompassed retail, corporate and investment banking activities as well as real estate brokerage. The company was nationalised by Denmark in October 2010 after becoming insolvent, with its Danish retail banking operations being sold later in the year to the regional bank Sparekassen Lolland.

== History ==
Føroya Sparikassi (now Betri banki) was established in 1832 as a savings bank . In 1992 it was transferred into a guarantor savings bank, and in 2002, it was converted to a public limited company. In 2006, it changed its name to Eik Banki, and on 11 July 2007, it was listed on the Icelandic and Danish stock exchanges as Eik Banki P/F.

In Denmark, Eik Banki founded a subsidiary bank, Eik Bank Danmark A/S. In 2007, Eik Bank Danmark acquired the Swedish Skandiabanken branch in Denmark. Skandiabanken is the leading Danish internet bank in Denmark, with around 120,000 customers. Skandiabanken was merged into Eik Bank Danmark in December 2007. In the same month Eik Bank acquired the Faroese operations of Kaupthing Bank.

The company and its Danish subsidiary were taken over by the Danish banking regulator in October 2010 after failing to meet solvency requirements set by the Financial Supervisory Authority. Trading in the company's shares and bonds was suspended on the news, and Eik Banki's listing on the Nasdaq OMX Iceland exchange was subsequently cancelled. Subsequently 70% of the bank's shares were sold to Tórshavn based TF Holding for DKK 572 million. The bank later became Betri bank. Three of Eik's managers were fined DKK 150 million in 2019.

The retail banking operations of the company in mainland Denmark (Eik Bank Danmark A/S) were sold by the state to the regional bank Sparekassen Lolland for DKK 365 million on 17 December 2010.

On 21 March, 2017, the bank changed its name again, this time to Betri Banki. Its parent company, TF Holding changed its name to Betri, and subsequently Eik banki changed its name to Betri Banki, and Tryggingarfelag Føroya to Betri Trygging.

== Operations ==
After the sale of Eik Banki's Danish retail banking operations in December 2010, the company's principal remaining businesses are a retail and commercial banking network in the Faroe Islands and ownership of the leading Faroese real estate brokerage company, Inni P/F.

== See also ==
- List of banks in Denmark
