= Amager Bryghus =

Danish microbrewery

Coordinates: 55°37′26″N 12°35′39″E

- Industry: Craft beer
- Founded: 2007
- Founders: Morten Lundsbak, Jacob Storm
- Headquarters: Tårnby Kommune, Copenhagen, Denmark
- Website: Amager Bryghus

Amager Bryghus is a Danish microbrewery situated on the island of Amager. It was founded in 2007 by Morten Valentin Lundsbak and Jacob Storm in an old warehouse previously owned by the Church of Scientology. Its first beer to make it into the Ratebeer Top 50 was an Imperial Stout called Hr. Frederiksen. This particular beer was crafted to celebrate a friend of the owners, Peter Frederiksen, who helped them for a whole year in setting up the brewery. Owing to the success of Hr. Frederiksen, they partnered with Shelton Brothers and began exporting to the United States. Since 2009 they have been in the Ratebeer top 100 breweries list.

In 2013, one of the labels for their beer Lust was censored by the Swedish state alcohol authority (Systembolaget) because it depicted a topless woman. This was considered unacceptable by Systembolaget because "sexual success can not be associated with drinking beer". This created a controversy around censorship featured by the Swedish media.

In 2017, Amager Bryghus moved to larger premises at Kirstinehøj 38B in Kastrup, next to Copenhagen Airport.

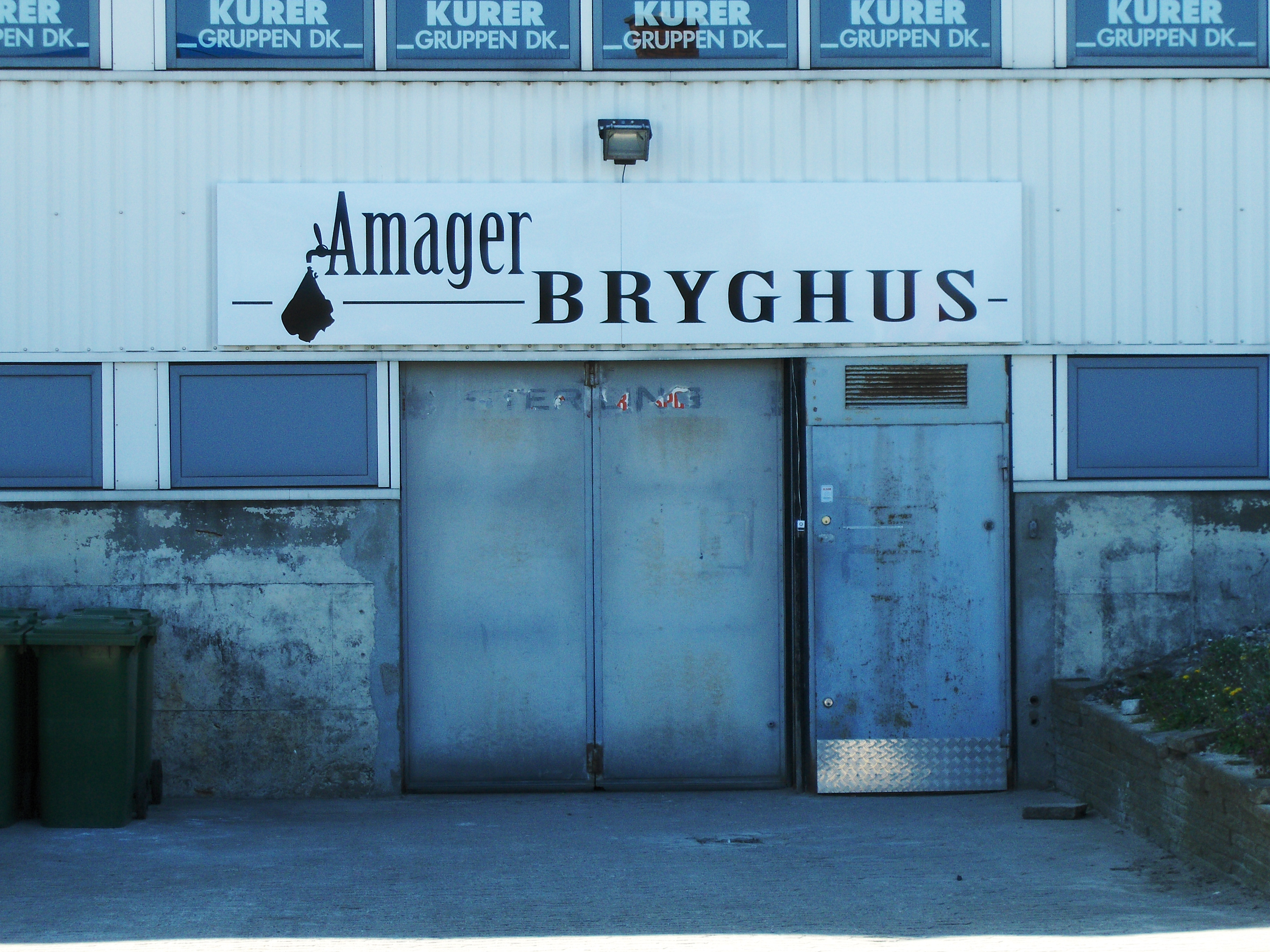
Amager Bryghus

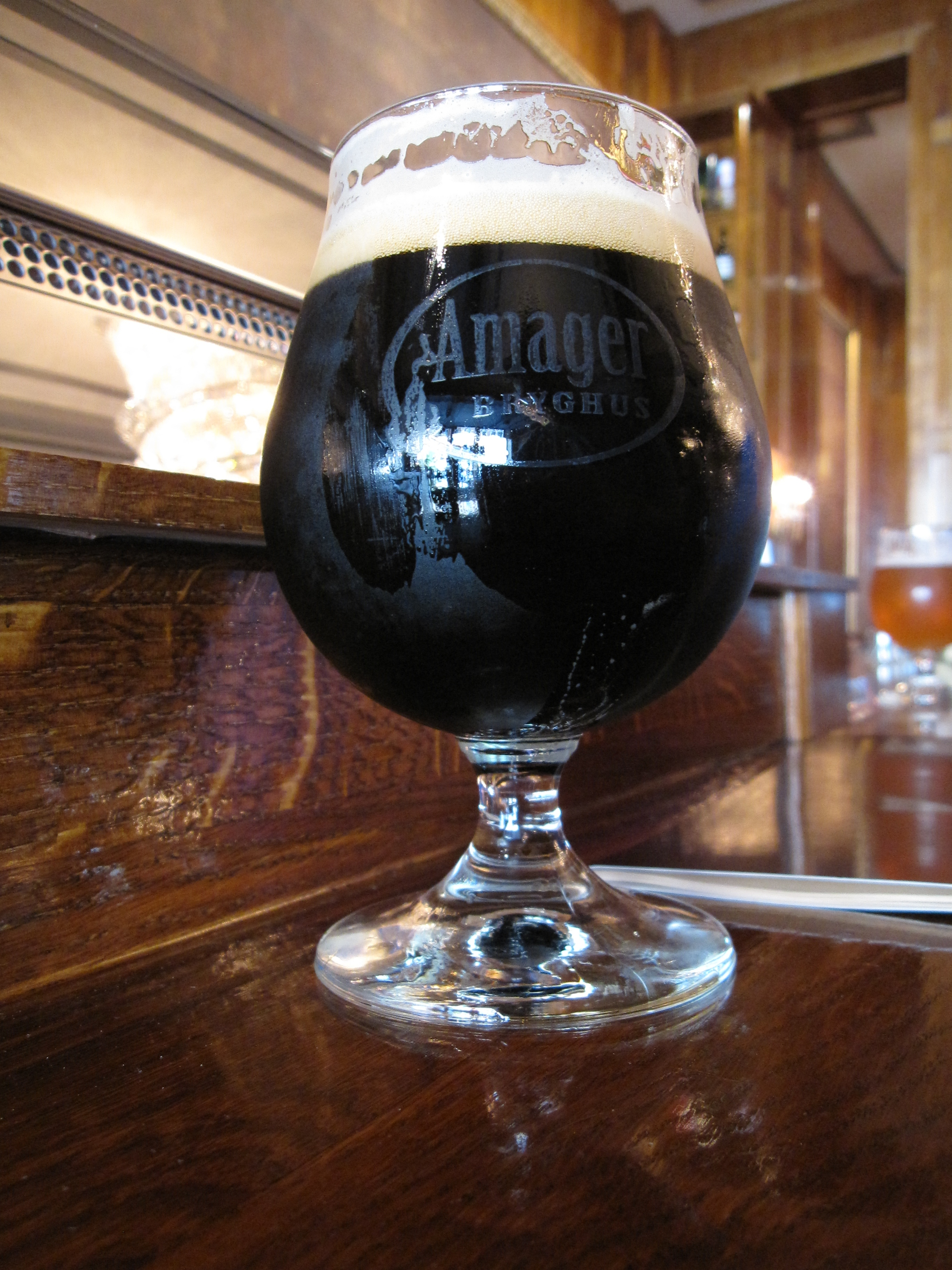
A glass of Amager Ryeporter beer
