= Restorffs Bryggjarí =

Faroese brewing company

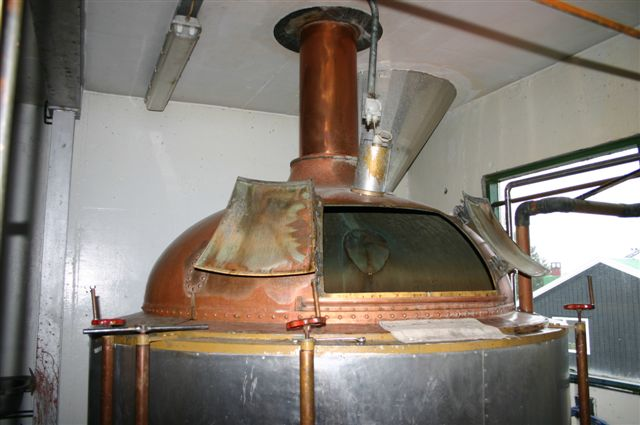
Brewery boiler

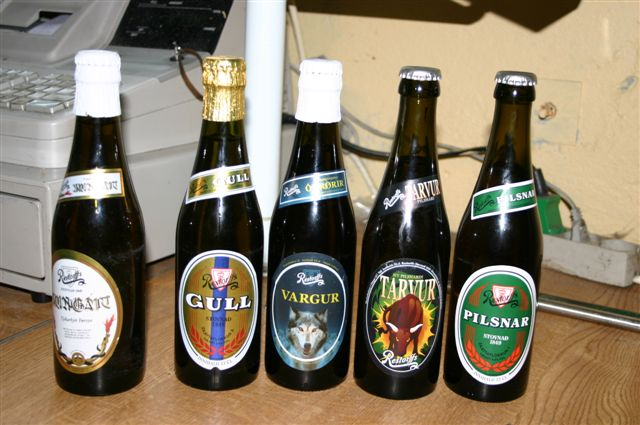
Beer type

Restorffs Bryggjarí was a Faroese brewing company established by the Danish-German immigrant Martin Christian Restorff in 1849.

== History ==
Restorffs Bryggjarí was situated in the capítal Tórshavn, where the majority of its beer production was sold. The brewery was family owned until 2002, when it was sold on to a local businessmen. In 2005 the production of soft drinks (soda drinks) was discontinued letting the other Faroese competitor, Föroya Bjór, take over a few of the brands. In January 2007 the Restorffs Bryggjarí was announced for sale and in August that same year the brewery went out of business. The Föroya Bjór brewery since took over some of the Restorffs beer brands. The brewery only sold its beers in the Faroe Islands though some small quantities were exported to Denmark in the latter years of its existence.

Restorffs was one of the oldest brewing companies in the Danish Kingdom.
