= Brøckhouse Brewery =

Defunct Danish micro brewery

Coordinates: 55°56′57″N 12°15′28″E

Brøckhouse was a Danish micro brewery, located in Hillerød that was founded in 1995, (2002), by brewer Allan Poulsen. It reached a peak production capacity of 500.000 litres per year.

The brewery specialised in brewing beers that was influenced by beers based on Danish history. Among others the Esrum Abbey Ale with inspiration from beer brewed in the Danish Esrum Abbey which was released in the autumn of 2004.

It experienced financial difficulties in connection with the 2008 financial crisis and filed for bankruptcy February 2009.
