= Carlsberg Group =

Danish brewery group

Carlsberg A/S

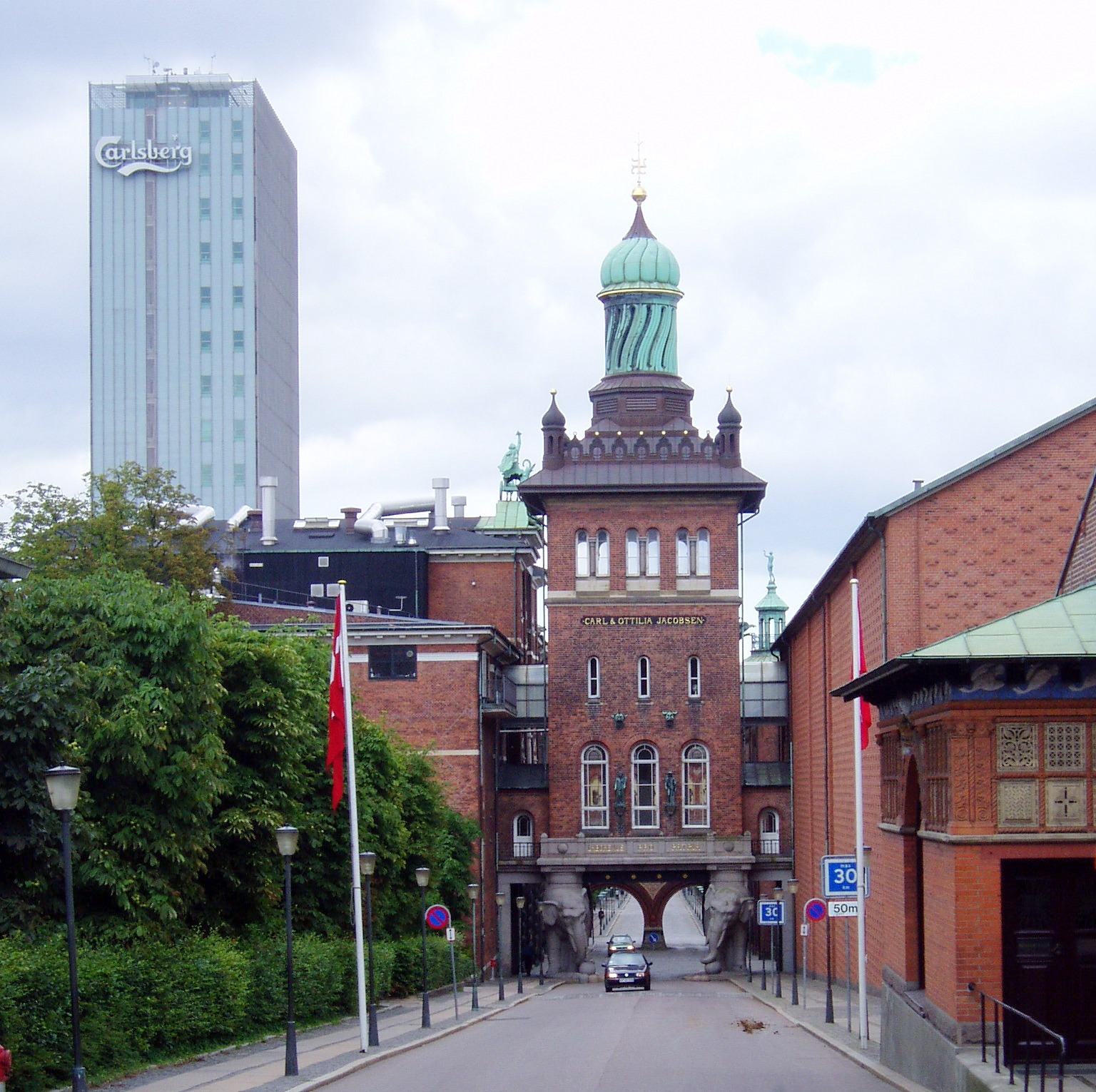
- Carlsberg's headquarters (left) in Copenhagen
- Type: Aktieselskab
- Traded as: Nasdaq Copenhagen: CARL A; CARL B; OMXC25CAP component
- Industry: Drink industry
- Founded: 1847; 179 years ago
- Founder: J. C. Jacobsen
- Headquarters: Copenhagen, Denmark
- Area served: Worldwide
- Key people: Jacob Aarup-Andersen (CEO)
- Products: Beers, ciders, soft drinks, bottled water
- Brands: Carlsberg, Tuborg, Kronenbourg 1664, Grimbergen, Somersby, Holsten
- Revenue: DKK 89.095 billion (2025)
- Operating income: DKK 13.356 billion (2025)
- Net income: DKK 6.978 billion (2025)
- Total assets: DKK 153.955 billion (2025)
- Total equity: DKK 27.804 billion (2025)
- Number of employees: 36,998 (2025)
- Website: www.carlsberggroup.com

Carlsberg A/S (/ˈkɑːrlzbɜːrɡ/ KARLZ-burg, Danish: [ˈkʰɑˀlsˌpɛɐ̯ˀ]) is a Danish multinational brewer. Founded in 1847 by J. C. Jacobsen, the company's headquarters is in Copenhagen, Denmark. Since Jacobsen's death in 1887, the majority owner of the company has been the Carlsberg Foundation. The company's flagship brand is Carlsberg, named after Jacobsen's son Carl Jacobsen. The company employs around 33,000 people, primarily in Europe and Asia. Carlsberg is currently the seventh largest brewery in the world based on revenue.

== History ==
=== Early history ===
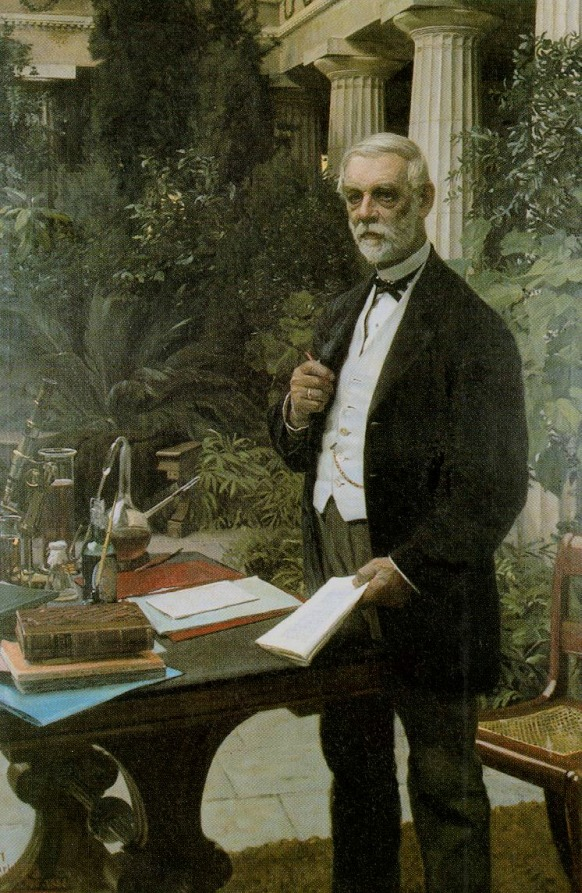
J.C. Jacobsen standing in his winter garden known as Pompeji, next to a table with laboratory equipment, a bottle of lager, a beer glass, and books by Louis Pasteur and Emil Christian Hansen. Painting by August Jerndorff (1886).

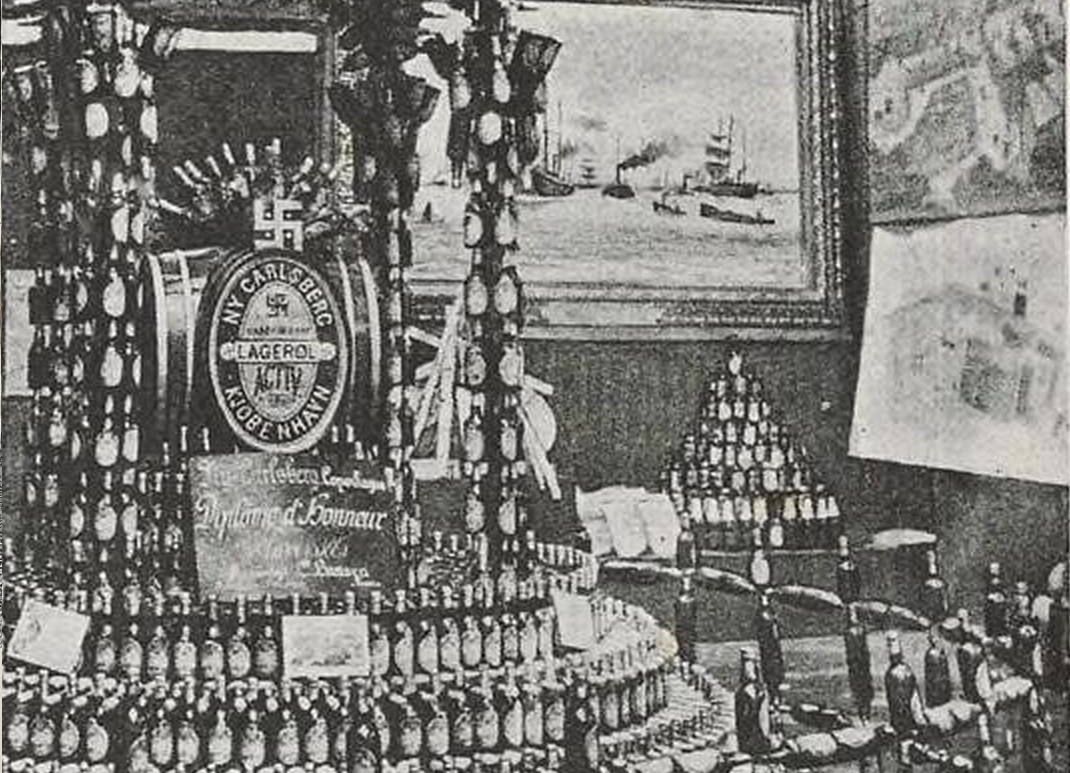
Diplome d'Honneur Antwerp 1885 expo

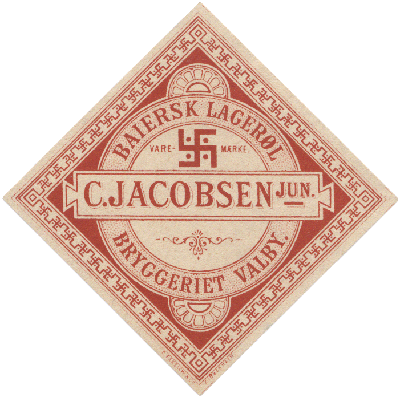
C. Jacobsen Junior label

Carlsberg was founded by J. C. Jacobsen, a philanthropist and admirer of science. The first brew was finished on 10 November 1847, and the export of Carlsberg beer began in 1868 with the export of one barrel to Edinburgh, Scotland. Some of the company's original logos include an elephant, after which some of its lagers are named, and the swastika, (Note: Sample image of a label featuring swastika) the use of which was discontinued in the 1930s because of its association with the Nazi party in neighboring Germany.

Jacobsen's son, Carl Christian Hilmar Jacobsen, opened a brewery in 1882 named Ny (New) Carlsberg; this forced J.C. Jacobsen to rename his brewery Gamle (Old) Carlsberg. Carl Jacobsen was an avid art collector. With his fortune, he amassed an art collection first housed privately, but since 1897 housed public in the Ny Carlsberg Glyptotek in central Copenhagen. The companies were merged and run under Carl's direction in 1906 and remained so until his death in 1914.

Jacobsen set up the Carlsberg Laboratory in 1875, which worked on scientific problems related to brewing. It featured a Department of Chemistry and a Department of Physiology. The species of yeast used to make pale lager, Saccharomyces carlsbergensis, was isolated by Emil Christian Hansen at the laboratory in 1883 and bears its name; this was shared freely by Carlsberg. The Carlsberg Laboratory also developed the concept of pH and made advances in protein chemistry. In 1972, the Carlsberg Research Centre was established and the Carlsberg Laboratory is an independent unit of the centre.

In 1876, J.C. Jacobsen established the Carlsberg Foundation, run by trustees from the Royal Danish Academy of Sciences and Letters, which managed the Carlsberg Laboratory as well as supporting scientific research within the fields of natural sciences, mathematics, philosophy, the humanities and social sciences in Denmark. Because of a conflict with his son Carl, Jacobsen's brewery was left to the Foundation upon his death in 1887.

=== Overseas activities and recent history ===
The first overseas license for brewing was given to the Photos Photiades Breweries, and in 1966 Carlsberg beer was brewed for the first time outside Denmark at the Photiades breweries in Cyprus. The first brewery to be built outside Denmark was in Blantyre, Malawi in 1968.

Carlsberg merged with Tuborg Breweries in 1970 (but backdated to 1969) forming the "De forenede Bryggerier" (United Breweries AS), and merged with Tetley in 1992. Carlsberg became the sole owner of Carlsberg-Tetley in 1997.

In 2008, Carlsberg Group, together with Heineken, bought Scottish & Newcastle, the largest brewer in the UK, for £7.8bn ($15.3bn).

In 2013, the company joined leading alcohol producers as part of a producers' commitments to reducing harmful drinking.

In November 2014, Carlsberg agreed to take over Greece's third largest brewery, the Olympic Brewery, adding to its operations in the country and effectively transforming the firm into the second biggest market player in Greece.

The old brewery in Copenhagen was once open for tours. In January 2020, the brewery was closed for a complete refurbishment. It reopened in a fully refurbished museum called Home of Carlsberg in December 2023.

In 2024, a High Court Judge approved a £3.3bn deal for Carlsberg to buy UK drinks maker Britvic. Carlsberg plans to create a single integrated drinks business called Carlsberg Britvic following the takeover. Britvic, external, based in Hemel Hempstead, Hertfordshire, employs about 4,500 people and produces J20, Robinsons squash and Tango.

== Regional operations ==
The Carlsberg Group divides their operations into three market areas: Northern and Western Europe, Eastern Europe and Asia.

=== Europe ===
Carlsberg Polska is the Polish subsidiary of the Carlsberg Group. Carlsberg acquired 100% control of the Okocim Group, which included the Okocim Brewery, in 2004. The subsidiary owns four brewing plants and employs a staff of 1,250. It is the third largest brewing company in Poland with a 14.4% market share. Brands include Harnaś, Kasztelan, Okocim, Piast, Somersby and Carlsberg. Žatecký Pivovar has been owned by Carlsberg since 2014. Previously, it was wholly owned by Kordoni Holding Limited based in Nicosia in Cyprus. The brewery is located in the Czech city of Žatec (German: Saaz) from which Saaz hops, a "noble" variety of hops which accounts for more than 2/3 of total 2009 hop production in the Czech Republic comes from.

Baltic Beverages Holding is owned by Carlsberg and primarily operates in the Baltic States and Ukraine. It owns Švyturys and Utenos Alus breweries in Lithuania and Saku Brewery in Estonia. Carlsberg acquired the Aldaris Brewery in Riga, Latvia, in 2008. The brewery was founded in 1865, and produces Aldaris brand beers.

Carlsberg Sweden (Sverige) is based in Stockholm, and owns the Falcon Brewery in Falkenberg, and the Ramlösa mineral water bottling facility in Helsingborg. Carnegie Porter, a 5.5% abv Baltic porter, along with the Pripps and Falcon brand lagers, are brewed in Falkenberg. Norway brands include: Arendals, Dahls, Frydenlund, Nordlands, Ringnes and Tou.

Other European brands include: Birrificio Angelo Poretti (Italy), Feldschlösschen (Switzerland), Holsten (Germany), Jacobsen (Denmark), Karhu (Finland), Kronenbourg (France), Super Bock (Portugal) and Tetley (UK).

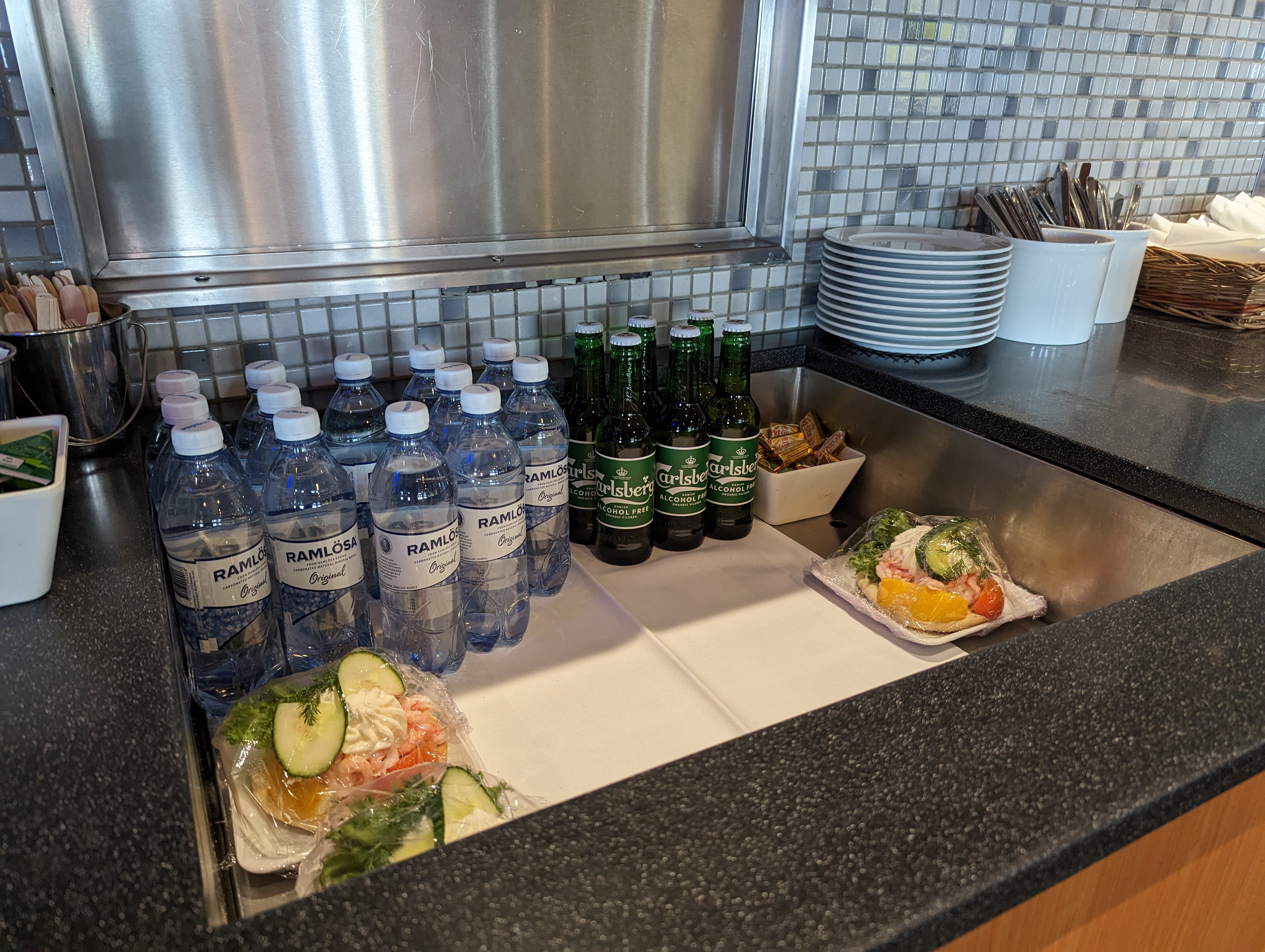
Carlsberg beer in Sweden

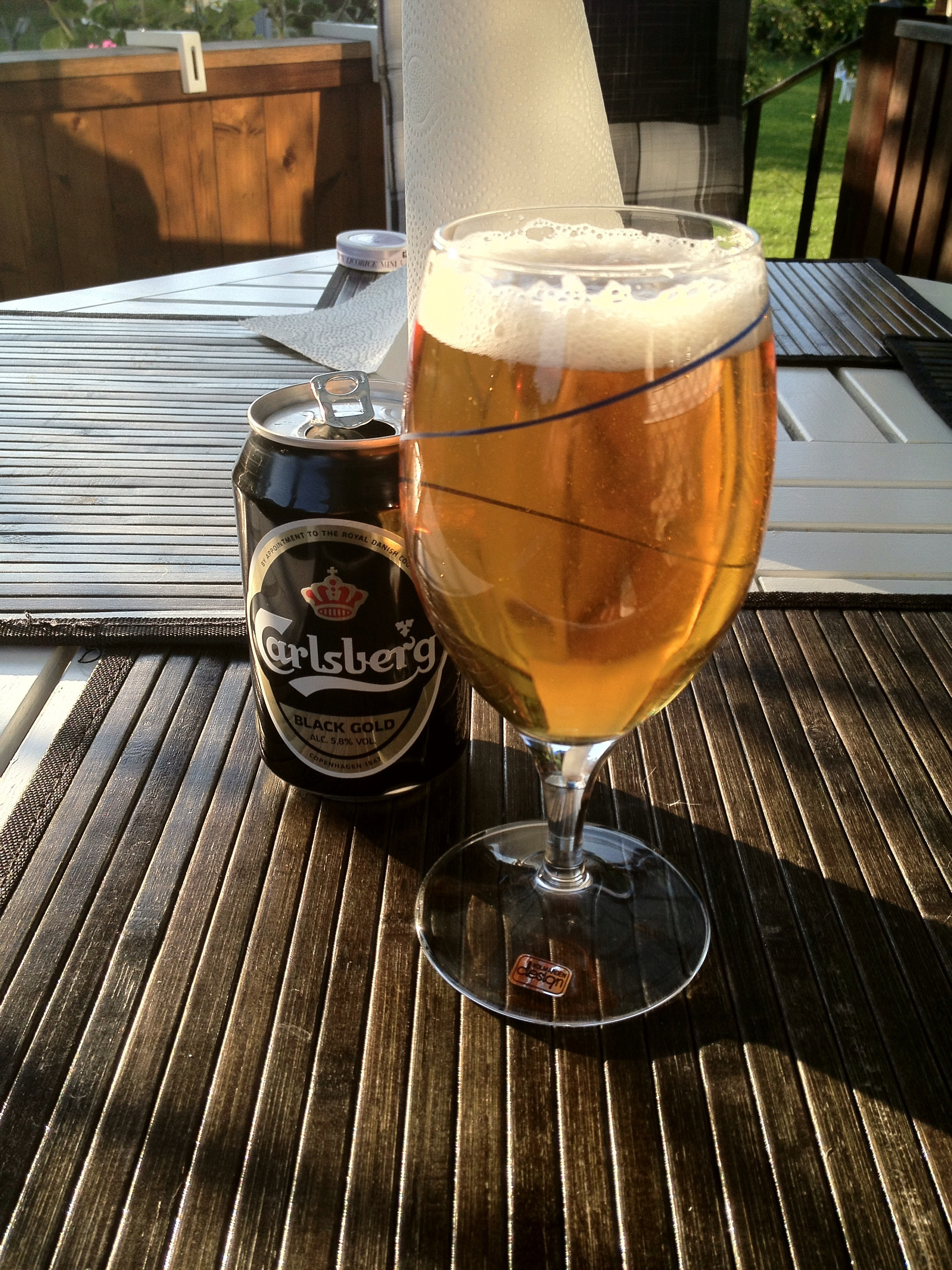
Carlsberg Black Gold 5,8%

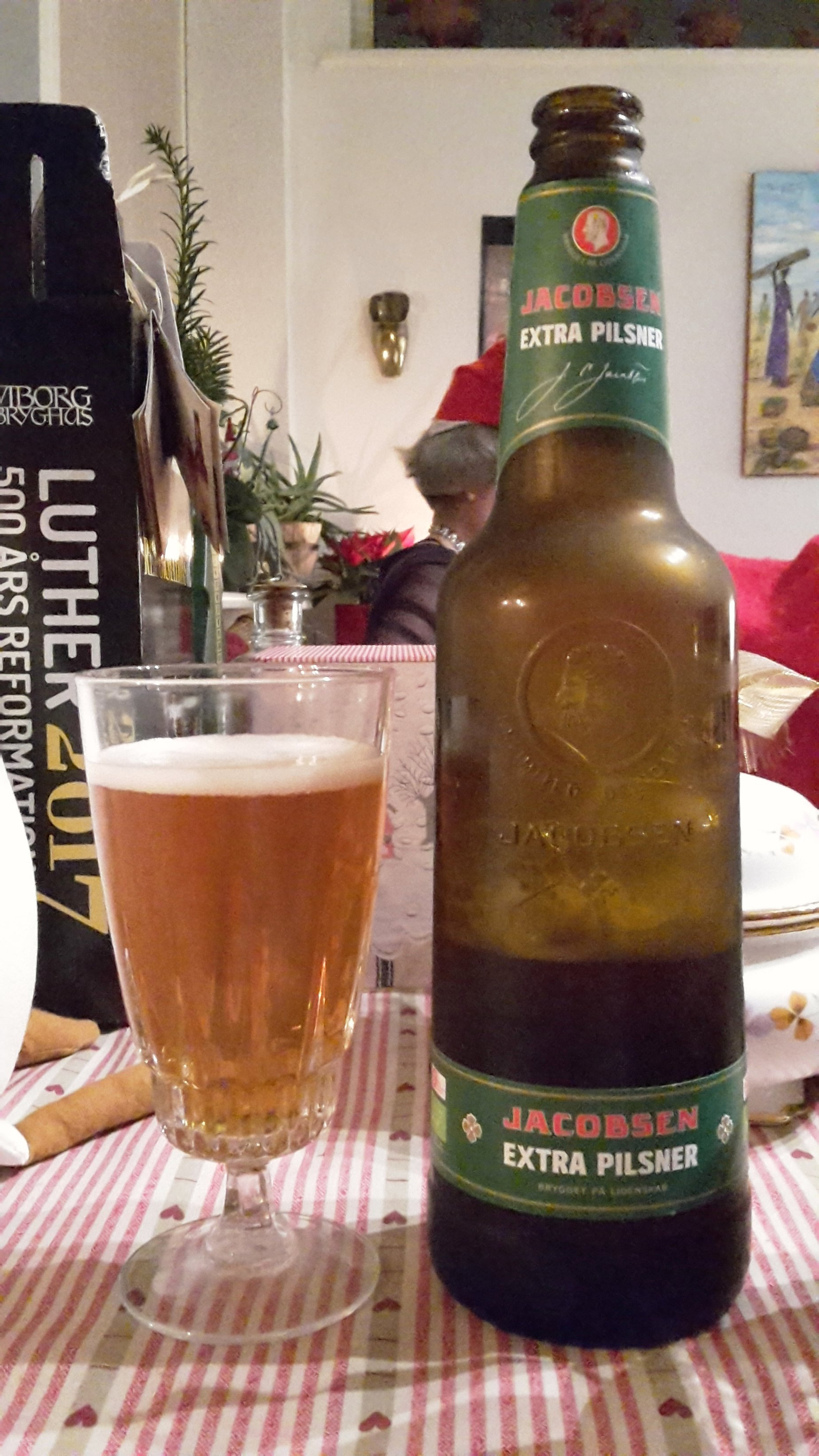
Jacobsen Extra Pilsner

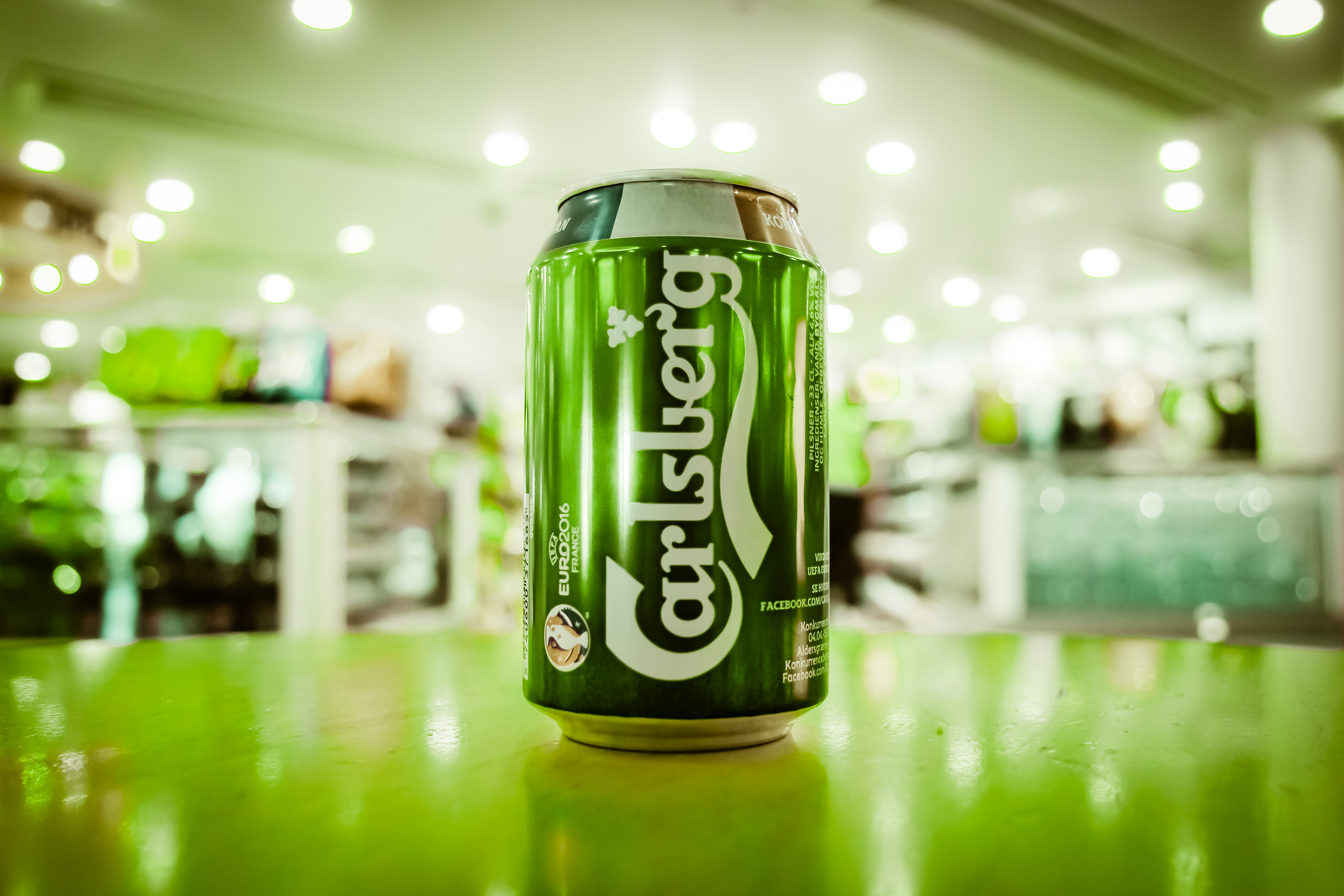
A Carlsberg beer in France

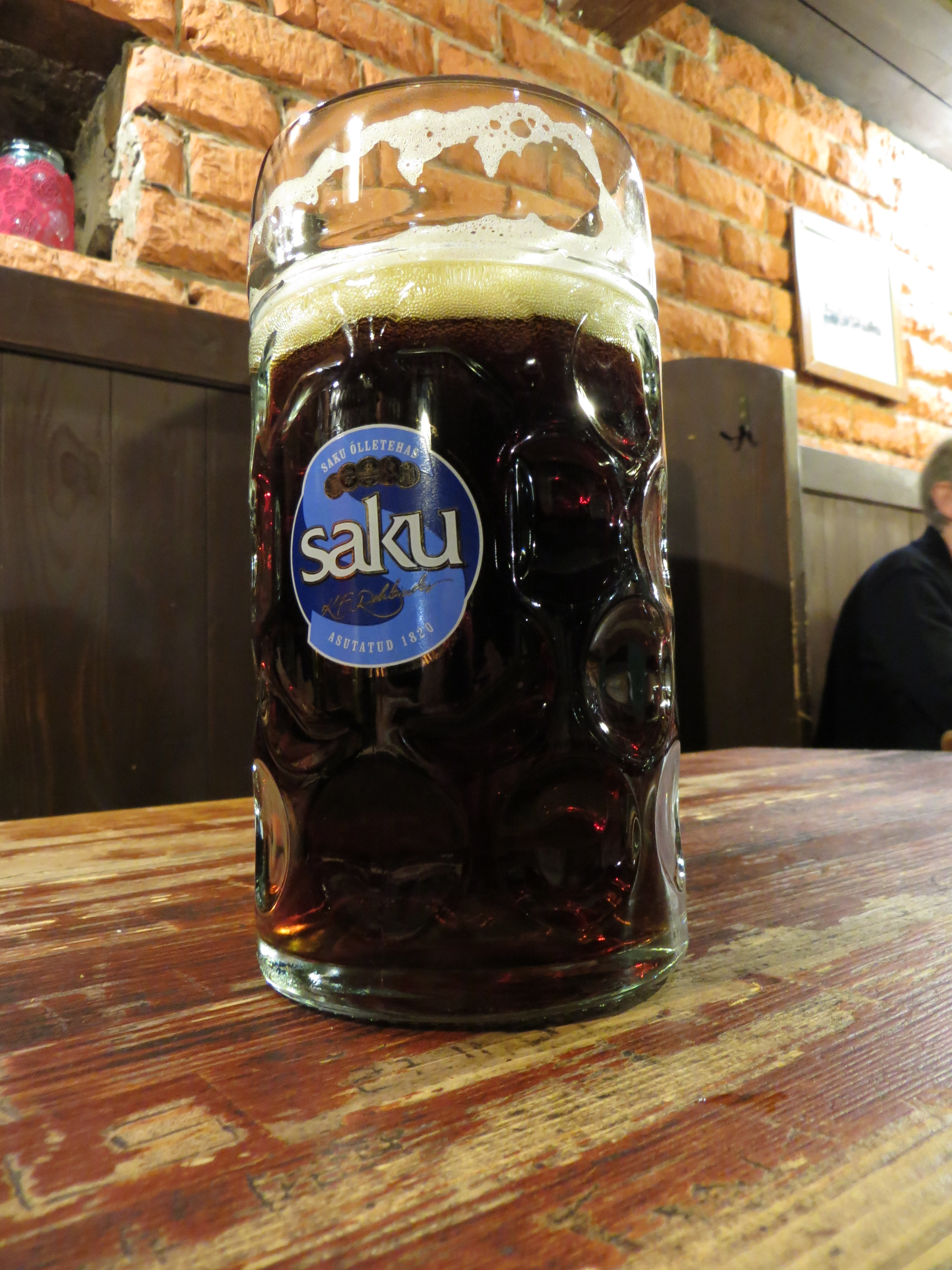
A Saku beer by Carlsberg

In October 2020, the UK Competition and Markets Authority approved the merger of Carlsberg UK and the brewing business of Marston's plc. The new company is based in Wolverhampton and known as Carlsberg Marston's Brewing Company, with Carlsberg taking a 60% share in the new company. In 2024, Marston's sold their 40% share in CMBC to Carlsberg for £206m in order to focus on running the pub business. In 2025, after acquiring Britvic, the company was renamed to Carlsberg Britvic, which includes Carlsberg UK, the former Marston's brewing business and Britvic.

=== Russia and CIS ===
The company is a significant operator in the brewing industry in Azerbaijan, Kazakhstan and Uzbekistan, owning its subsidiaries through Baltic Beverages Holding which initially was a joint venture between Carlsberg and Scottish & Newcastle in Russia. It had a majority interest in OAO Baltika Breweries, the largest brewery in the Russian Federation and Eastern Europe. In the spring of 2023, Carlsberg announced that it was leaving Russia and plans to sell its business before the end of spring. In late June, the company announced that it had closed the deal without naming a buyer. The deal is awaiting approval from the Russian authorities. In July 2023, the Russian government seized the shares of the Carlsberg-owned Baltika Breweries and placed the company under the control of the Russian Federal Agency for State Property Management.

The Uzbek government claimed the subsidiary owed $4.6 million in taxes from unreported revenue. Lower courts also claimed that Carlsberg illegally produced 1.6 million litres of beer from 2008 to 2010. For these reasons, in March 2012, Carlsberg suspended production at its Uzbek plant and asked its employees to take an unpaid leave. In late 2012, the Uzbek Court declined Carlsberg's tax appeal. Production resumed in April 2013. The brewery produces 1.3 million litres of beer under three local brands Sarbast Original, Sarbast Extra, and Sarbast Special, plus the international brand Tuborg Green.

In the Azerbaijan, Carlsberg is producing beer brand with the name Khirdalan.

=== North America ===
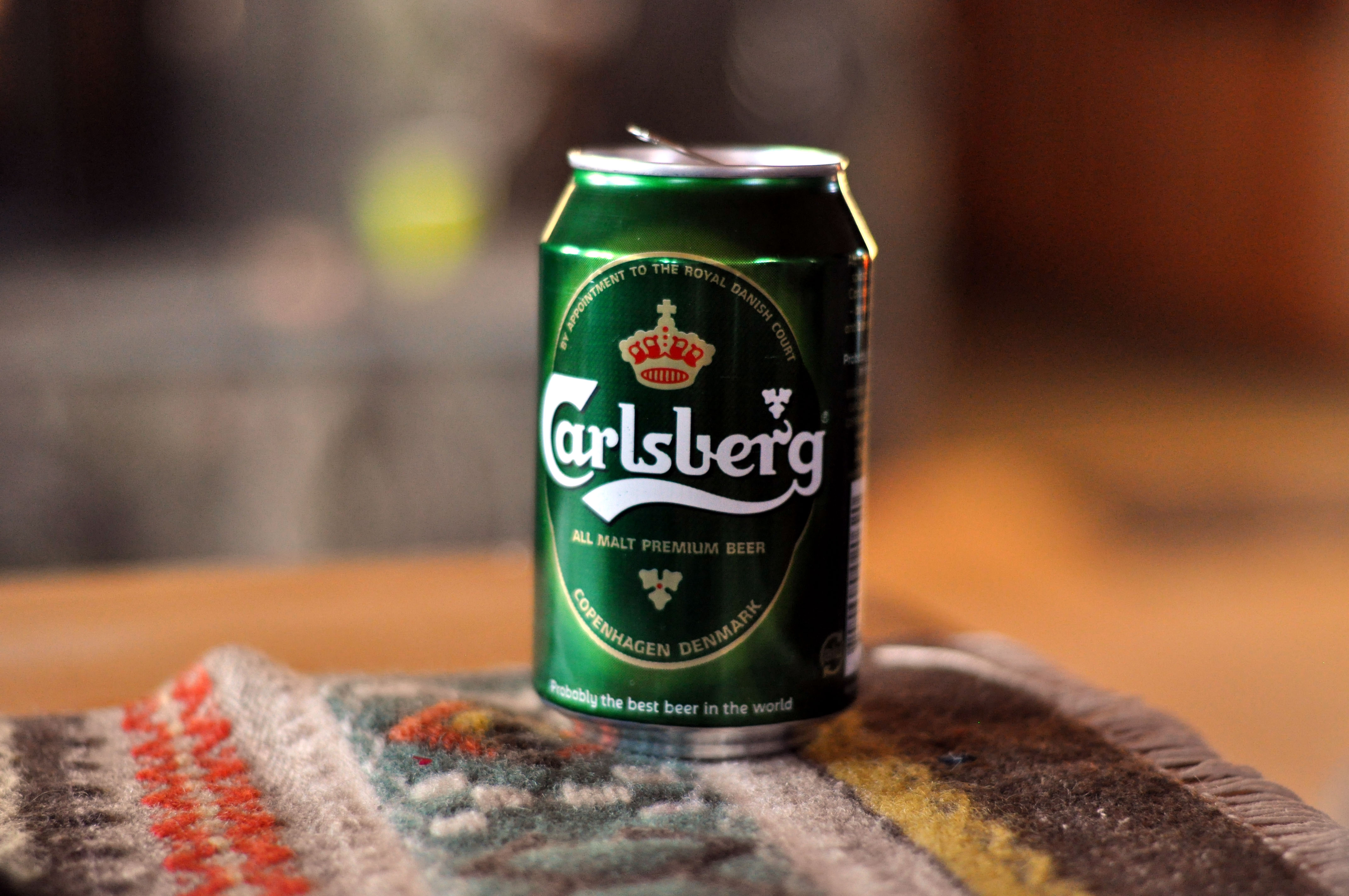
Carlsberg beer in USA and Canada

In the US, the Carlsberg group brands are distributed by St. Killian Import Co., based in Everett, Massachusetts, importing Carlsberg beer directly from Denmark. Brands that are imported include Carlsberg Pilsner (0.5 liter/16.9 oz. cans), Carlsberg Beer (bottles and kegs), Carlsberg Elephant, Kronenbourg 1664, Grimbergen, Tetley's English Ale, and Okocim.

Carlsberg was brewed in Canada by Canadian Breweries/Carling O'Keefe beginning in 1972. After Carling O'Keefe was merged with Molsons, Carlsberg opened its own brewery.

In December 2022, it was announced Carlsberg had acquired the Ontario-based company, Waterloo Brewing.

=== Asia ===
==== East Asia ====
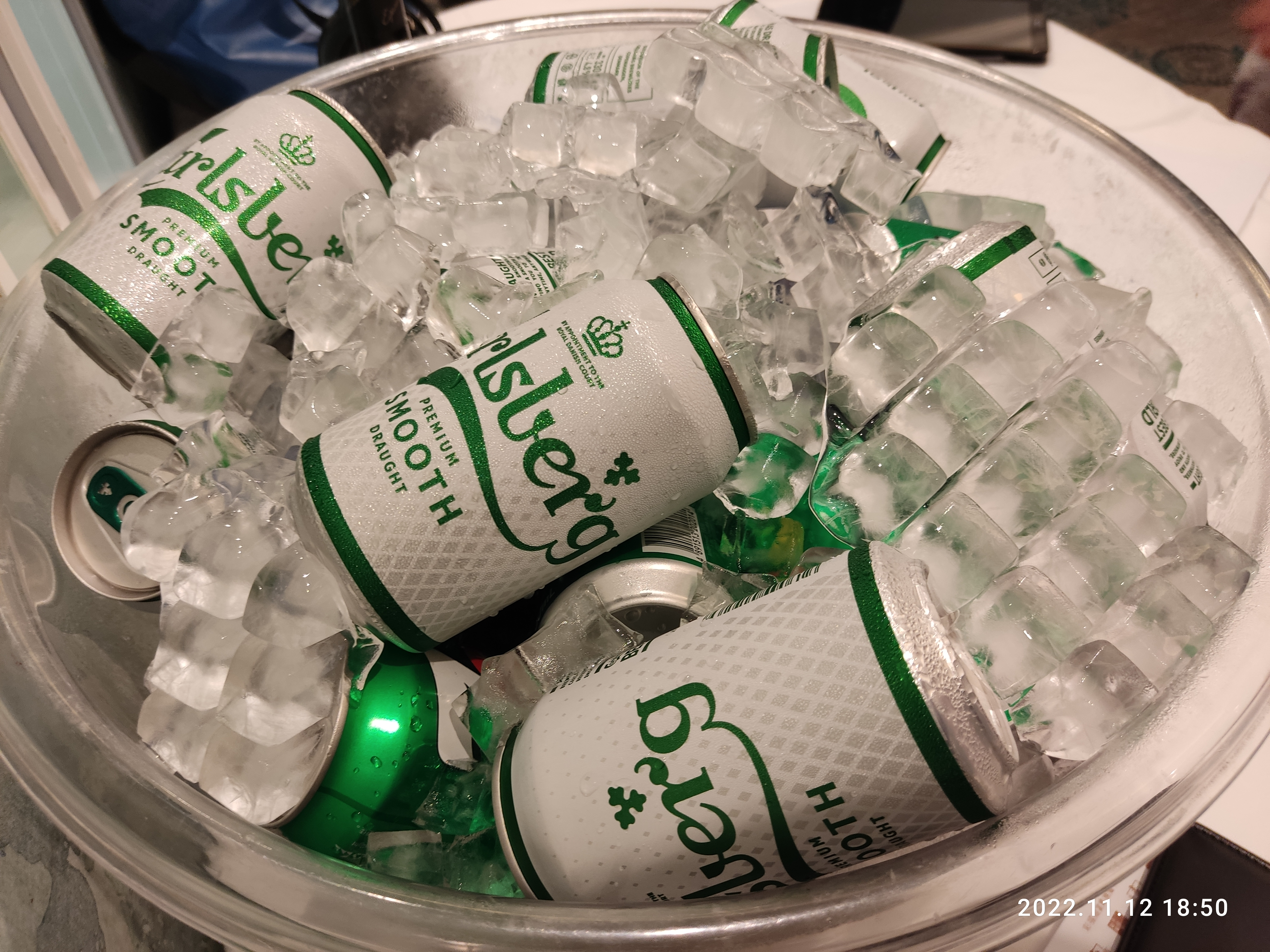
Carlsberg Premium Smooth Draught beer in Japan.

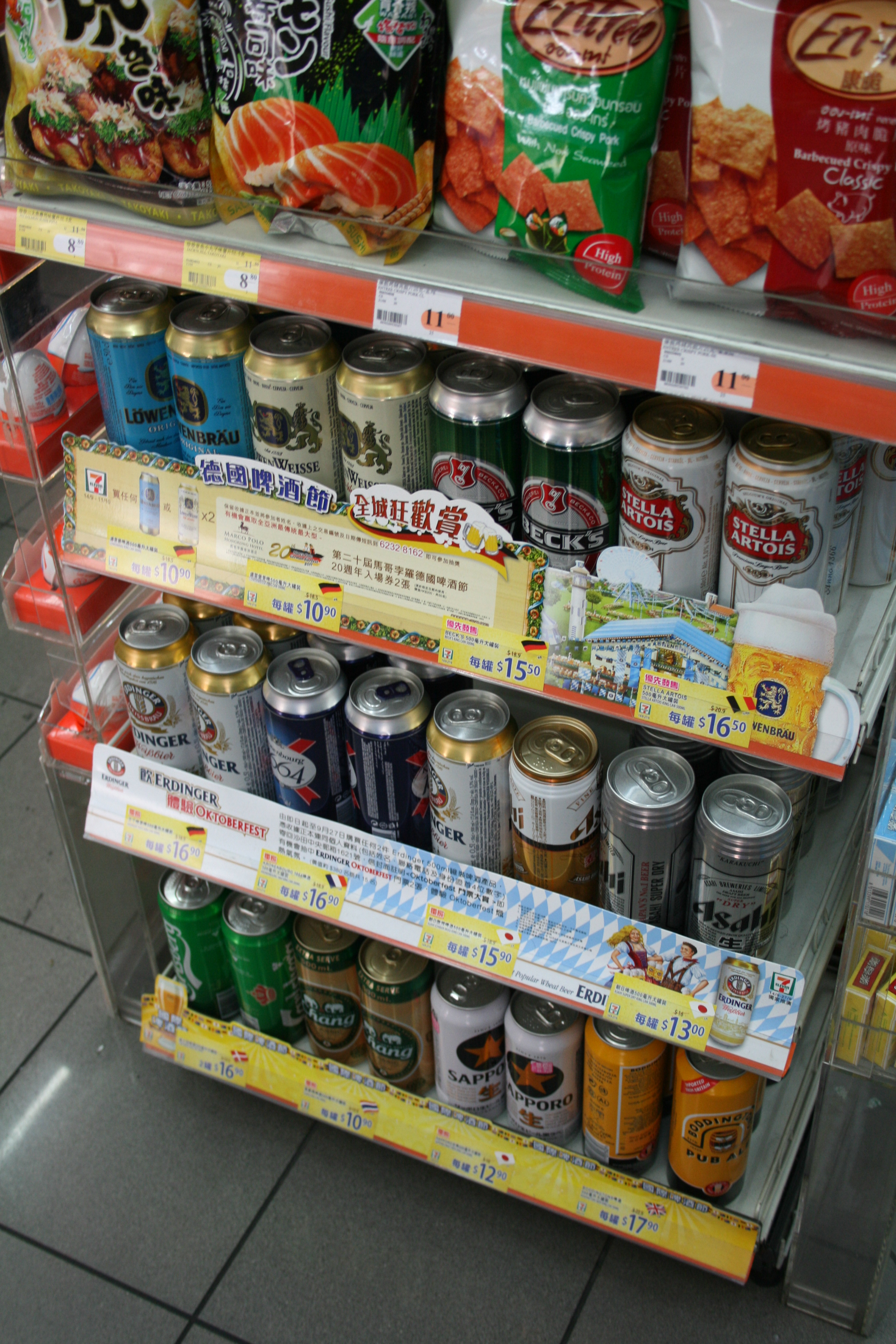
Some Carlsberg beers in Hong Kong.

Carlsberg started to export beer to China in 1876. In the late 1990s, Carlsberg had two breweries in China – Huizhou and Shanghai. The company acquired Huizhou Brewery in Guangdong Province in 1995, which started to supply both the mainland Chinese and Hong Kong market. Carlsberg invested around US$30 million in its Shanghai brewery, and started production in 1998. In 2000, Carlsberg sold a majority stake in its Shanghai brewery to Tsingtao Brewery. Carlsberg formerly had a brewery in Tai Po, Hong Kong; it was established in 1981, but shut it down in 1999 due to high costs.

In 2003, Carlsberg acquired the Kunming Brewery and the Dali Brewery in Yunnan province. At the time, the Dali Brewery was the largest beer brewery in Yunnan. In 2004, Carlsberg became a major shareholder in Lhasa Brewery in the Tibet Autonomous Region. At 3,700 metres above sea level, Lhasa Brewery is believed to be the highest altitude brewery in the Carlsberg Group.

In 2008, Carlsberg sold its remaining interest in the Shanghai brewery to Tsingtao Brewery.

In August 2011, Carlsberg announced a new joint venture with Chongqing Brewery and Chongqing Light Textile Holding. Chongqing Light Textile Holding is a major shareholder of Chongqing Brewery. The joint venture, to be called Chongqing Xinghui Investment Co., Ltd, would operate twelve breweries in China in Chongqing, Sichuan, Guangxi, Guizhou and Hunan. Chongqing Brewery would contribute five breweries and Chongqing Light Textile Holding would contribute seven breweries to the joint venture. Carlsberg would inject 160 million Danish crowns (about US$30.90 million) and have a 30% interest in the venture.

Carlsberg also owns Wusu Beer Group in Urumqi, Xinjiang in Northwest China.

==== South Asia ====
Carlsberg India Pvt. Ltd. headquartered in Gurgaon, India is a foreign direct investment company formed to brew and market Carlsberg beer in India. The company has also brought the Tuborg and Palone brands to India. Palone is sold as a 'strong' beer with 7.5% alcohol by volume. Strong beers dominate the Indian market, estimated in 2008 to total approximately 17 million hectolitres with over a 72% share. Carlsberg is available in most states of India, with five operational breweries in: Alwar (Rajasthan), Aurangabad (Maharashtra) both of which started in the summer of 2008, the former Hacke-Beck brewery in Paonta Sahib (Himachal Pradesh) where brewing commenced in July 2007, Kolkata (West Bengal) opened in September 2009, Patna Brewery (Patna) opened for brewing in 2014, Dharuhera Brewery opened on 7 May 2013, and Hyderabad (Telangana) opened in December 2010. Carlsberg India Pvt. Ltd. currently employs over 700 people and is headed by Michael Norgaard Jensen, managing director.

==== Southeast Asia ====
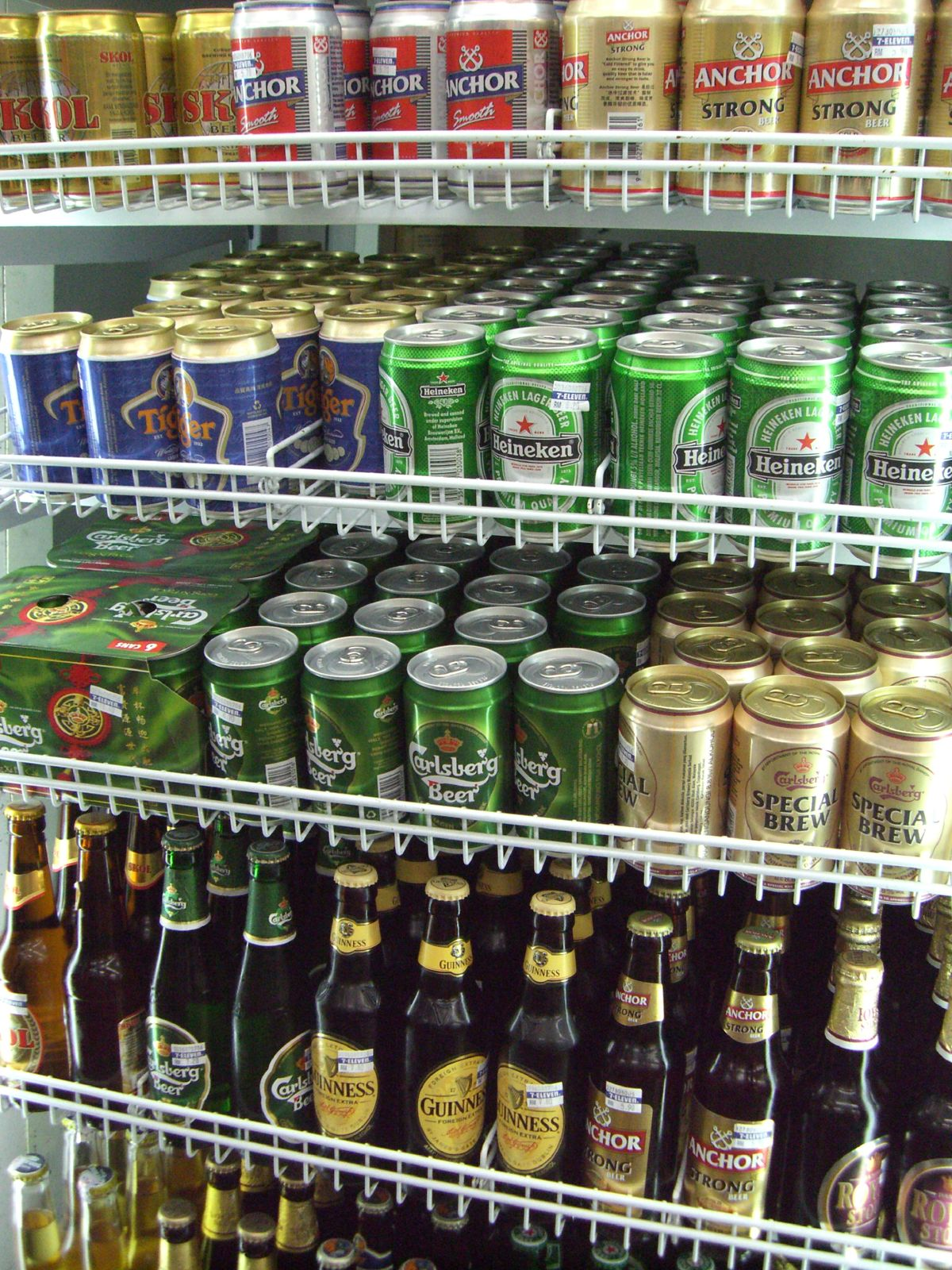
Some Carlsberg beers in Malaysia.

Carlsberg Brewery Malaysia Berhad (Carlsberg Malaysia) was incorporated in December 1969 and began brewing Carlsberg Green Label locally in 1972. It is located in Shah Alam, Selangor. Since then, the brand has become one of the leading beer brands with more than a 50% share of the Malaysian market. It manufactures and distributes beer, stout, and other beverages mainly in the domestic market and has investments in Sri Lanka, Singapore and in a Malaysian alcoholic beverage company. Brands under Carlsberg Malaysia include Carlsberg Danish Pilsner, Carlsberg Smooth Draught, Carlsberg Special Brew, Kronenbourg 1664 Blanc, Sapporo Premium Beer, Somersby Ciders, SKOL beer, Danish Royal Stout as well as non-alcoholic Nutrimalt drink. In addition, Carlsberg Malaysia, through its subsidiaries, has a wide range of imported international beer brands, including Hoegaarden, Stella Artois, Budweiser, Grimbergen, and Beck's. However, CBMB sold off its subsidiaries and focused on growing the Carlsberg Group brand. On 13 November 2024, managing director Stefano Clini announced the new RM343 million facilities in the brewery that is aimed at improving sustainability and increasing productivity efforts.

In the Philippines, Carlsberg beverages have been produced by Asia Brewery since 1982 in Cabuyao, Laguna. A television ad for Carlsberg beer in 1987 was criticized by the Movement Against Deceptive Advertising (MADA) for depicting the product as imported original Carlsberg beer from Denmark.

In Indonesia, Carlsberg is produced and distributed under a licensing agreement with Delta Djakarta, producer of Anker and San Miguel. San Miguel Brewery co-owned Delta Djakarta through 58.33% stock.

In January 2013, Carlsberg announced the formation of a joint venture with the Myanmar Golden Star (MGS) group to establish a beer production facility in the Bago Industrial Zone, about an hour's drive from Yangon, Myanmar. Carlsberg will hold a majority 51 per cent stake in the venture and will provide seed capital in the range of $35 million to $50 million, with construction slated to commence in February.

Singha beer began being produced by Carlsberg's Russian plant for distribution in European markets in March 2013.

Other Southeast Asian brands include Halida Beer (Vietnam).

==== West Asia ====
In Israel, the Israel Beer Breweries in Ashkelon produces Carlsberg and Tuborg. Carlsberg and Tuborg were launched on the Israeli market in 1992. Initially they were imported from Copenhagen, but in 1995 local production began at a greenfield brewery. The brewery is situated above a large underground aquifer

== Beers ==
=== Carlsberg ===
A 33cl Carlsberg profile bottle

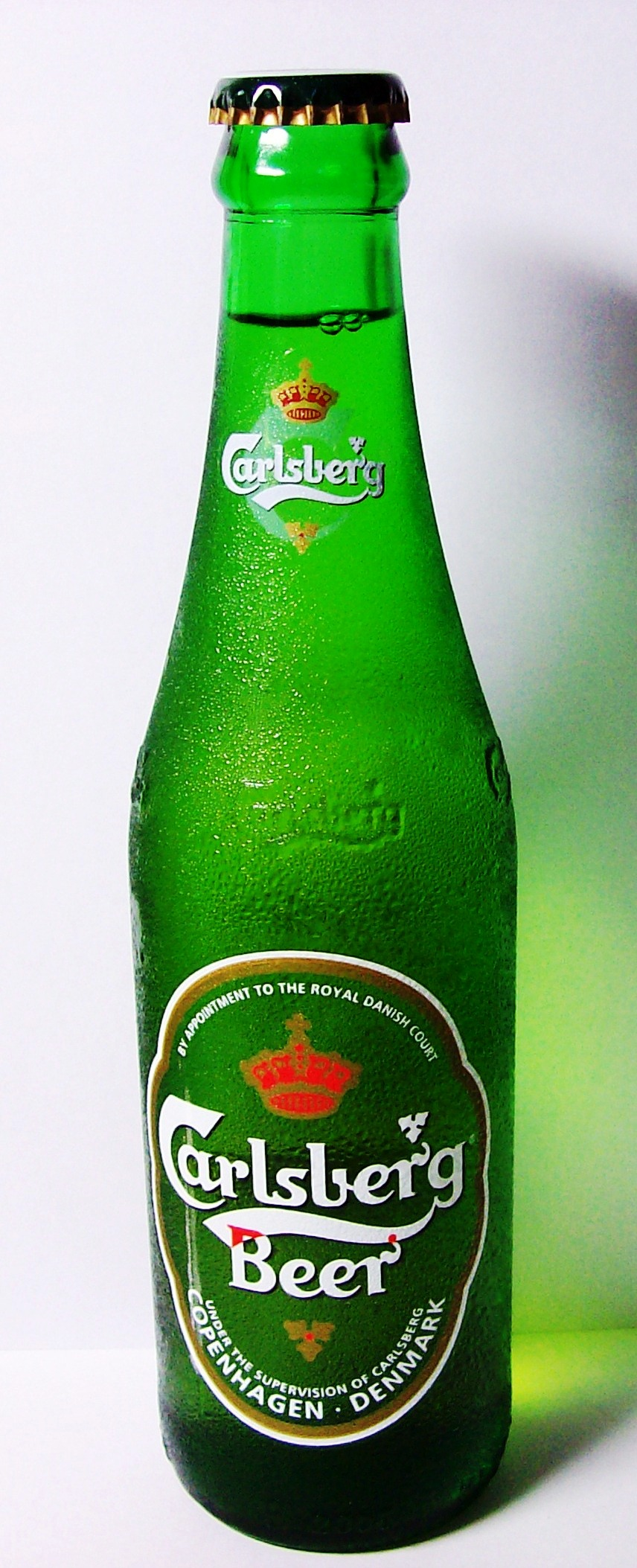
A Carlsberg bottle

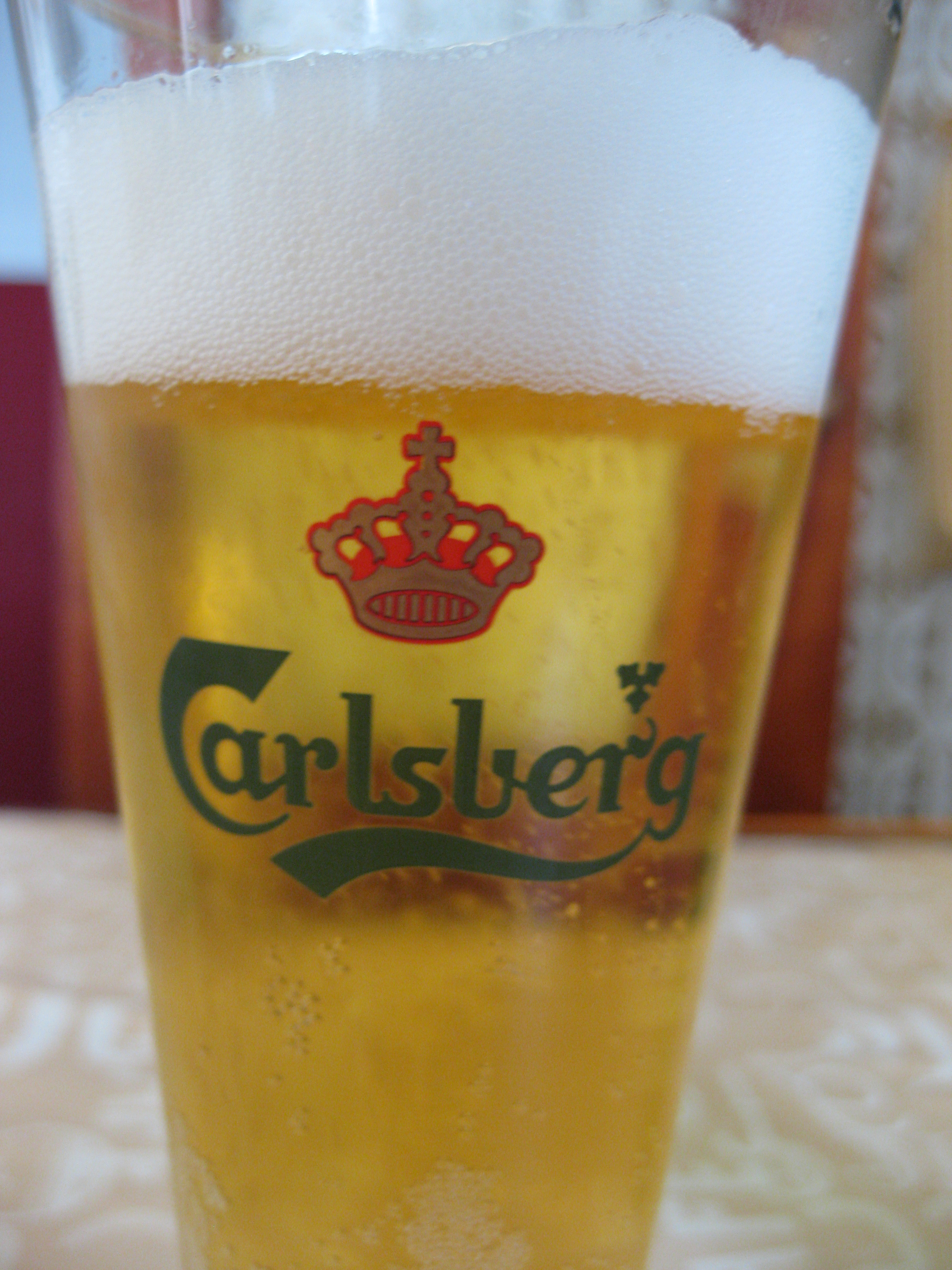
A Carlsberg beer glass.

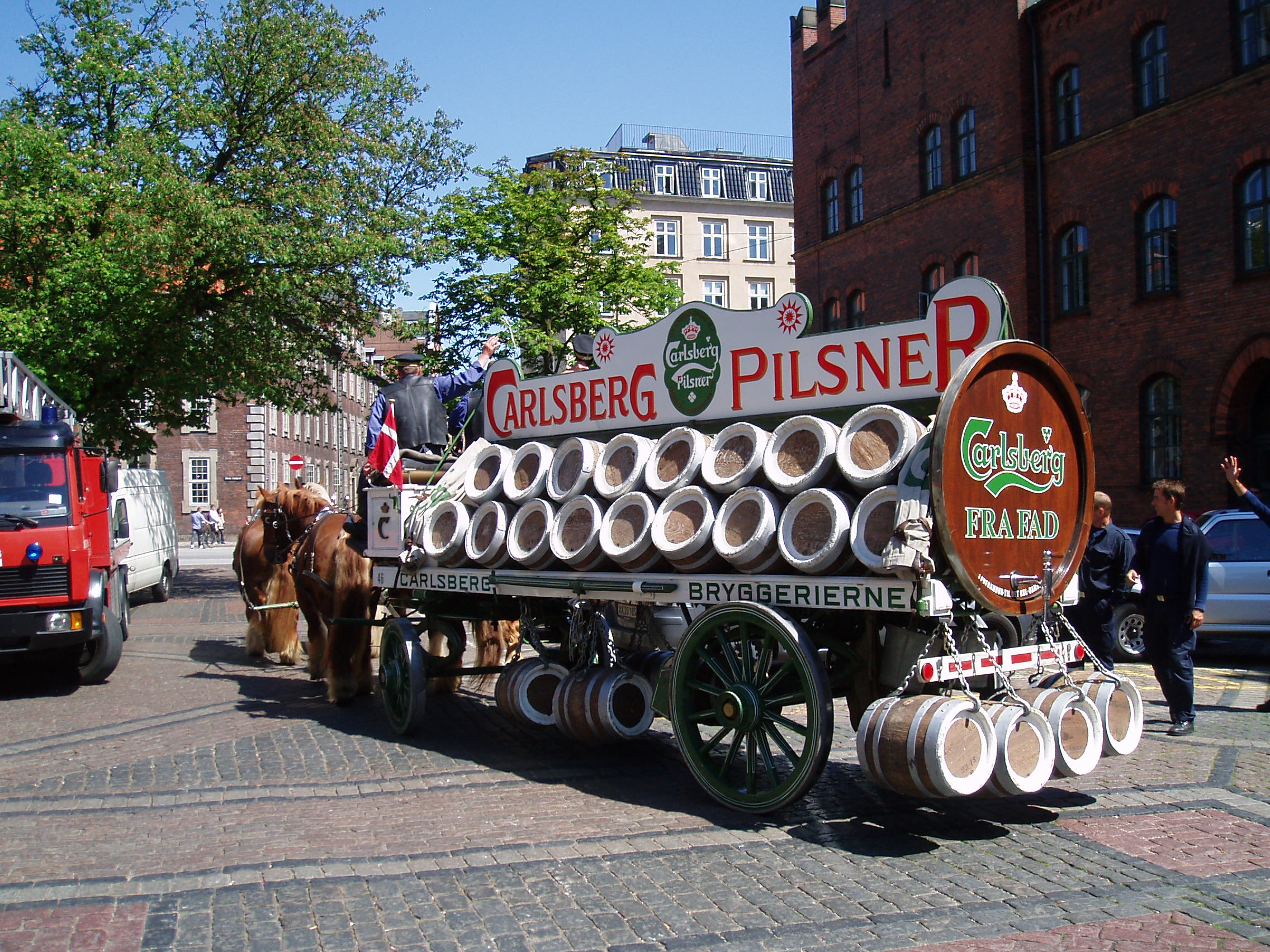
Carlsberg Pilsner and Carlsberg Draft beer

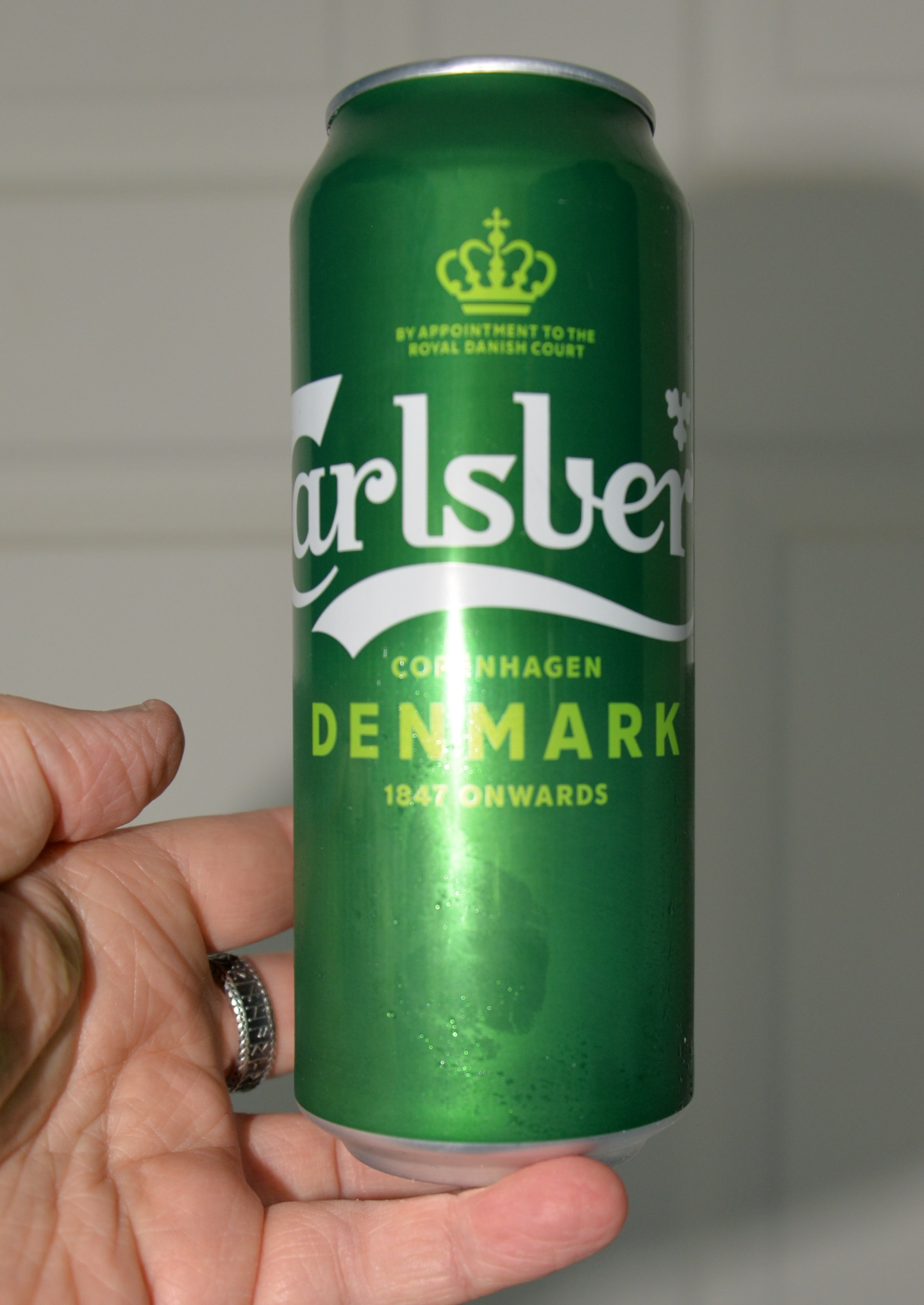
Carlsberg beer can

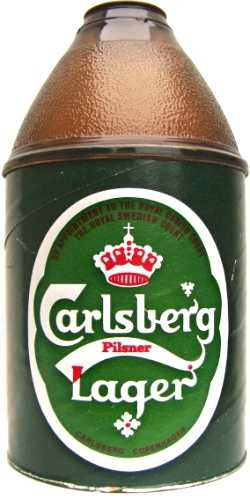
Carlsberg Lager beer

Carlsberg is the flagship beer brand in Carlsberg Group's portfolio of 155 brands. It is a 5% abv pilsner beer (Except in the UK, where it is 3.4% abv) with a global distribution to 140 markets. It is also known as Carlsberg Lager, Carlsberg Beer and Carlsberg Pilsner. It was first brewed in 1904, and was created by Carl Jacobsen, son of Carlsberg's founder J. C. Jacobsen.

The introduction of the Carlsberg pilsner also saw the reintroduction of the Art Nouveau-style logo that has been used nearly unmodified since 1904, and later became the logo of the entire company. It was designed by Thorvald Bindesbøll.

In Denmark, the beer is often known as Hof (court) due to its Royal Warrant. This nickname was adopted into the brand in 1931 but discontinued in Denmark in 1991. The term is still used in other markets such as the UK and Sweden.

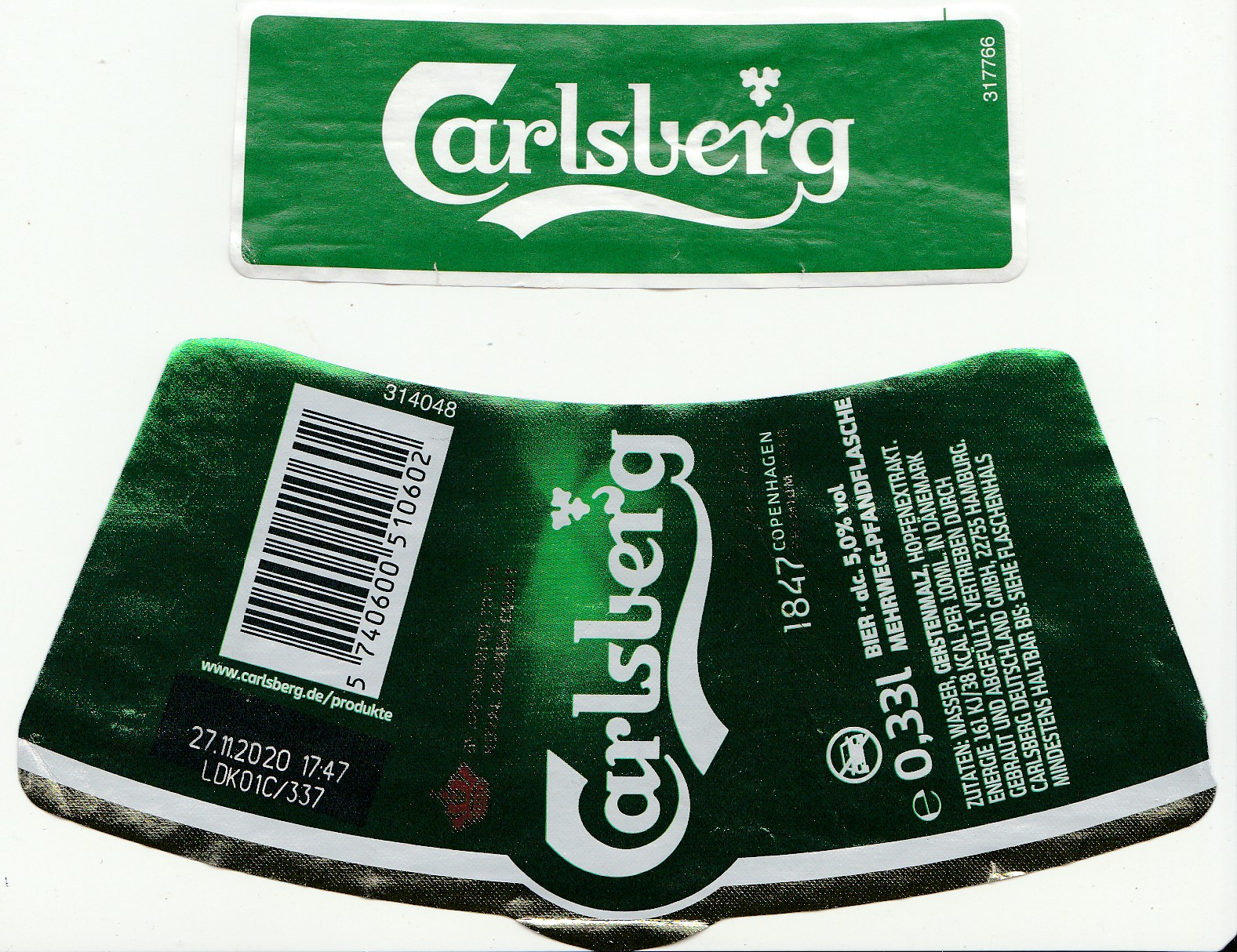
Carlsberg beer 5,0%

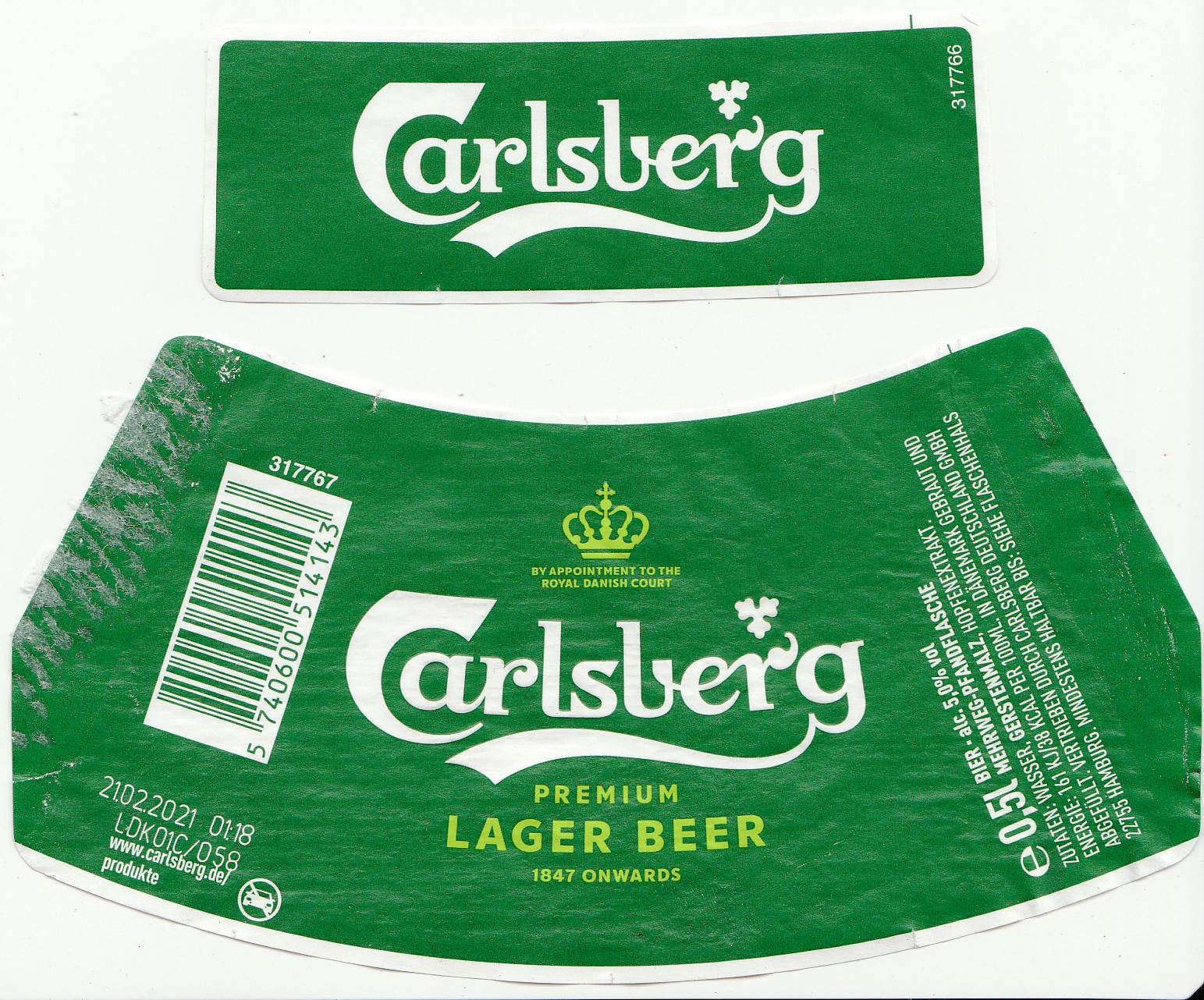
Carlsberg Premium Lager Beer 5,0%

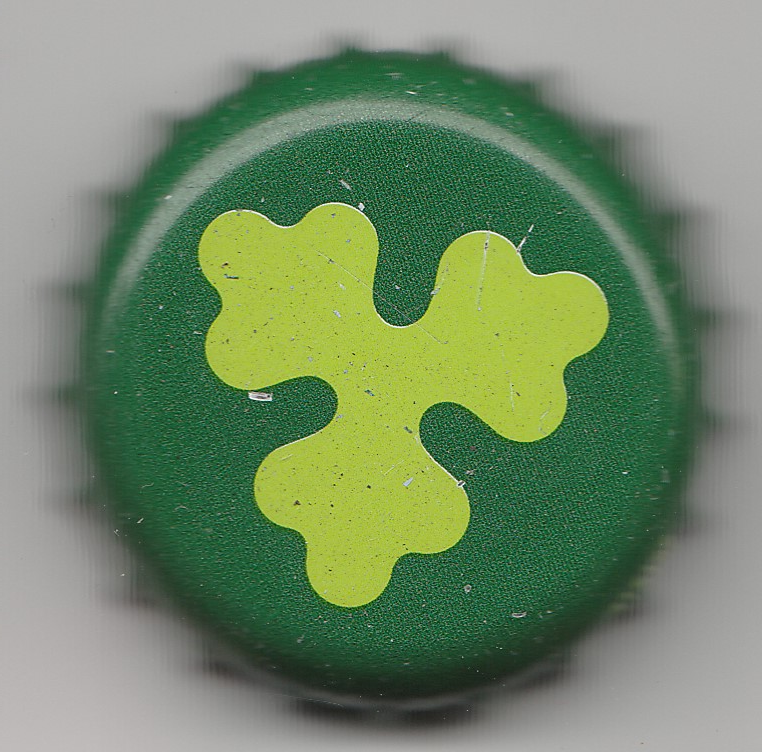
Cap of Carlsberg

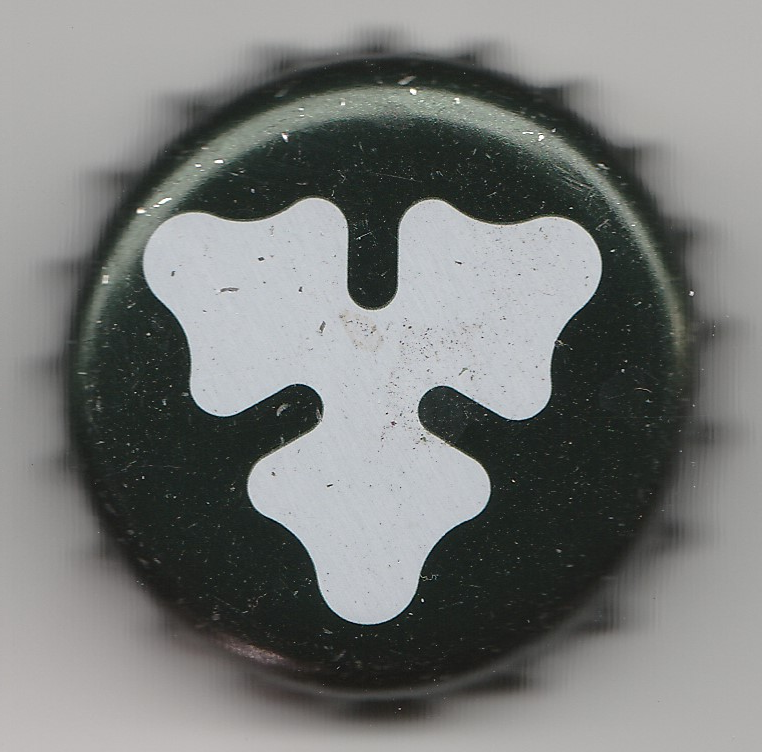

=== Special Brew ===
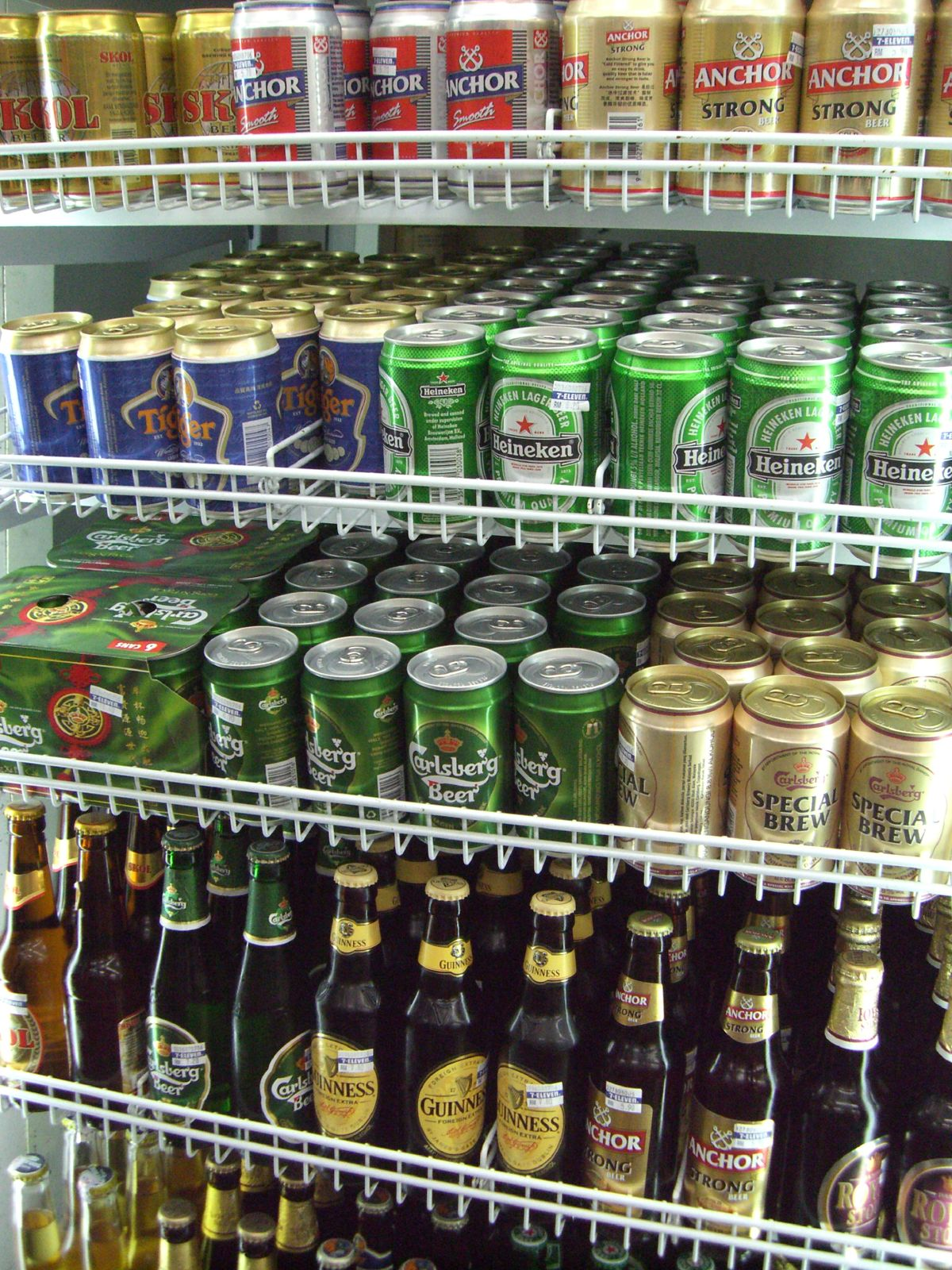
Carlsberg Special Brew.

Special Brew is a strong lager brewed only in Denmark, Sri Lanka and the United Kingdom. It was initially brewed by Carlsberg to commemorate a visit to Denmark by Winston Churchill in 1950. The flavour incorporates "cognac flavours among its tasting notes" as Churchill was partial to brandy. In May 1951 two crates were delivered to Churchill's London home. In a thank-you letter Churchill called the drink "Commemoration Lager". In Denmark the drink was called Påskebryg ("Easter Brew"), but the Easter Brew has since been replaced by a weaker beer (Carls Påske). For the British market Carlsberg called the drink Special Brew, and production was started in Northampton in 1974.

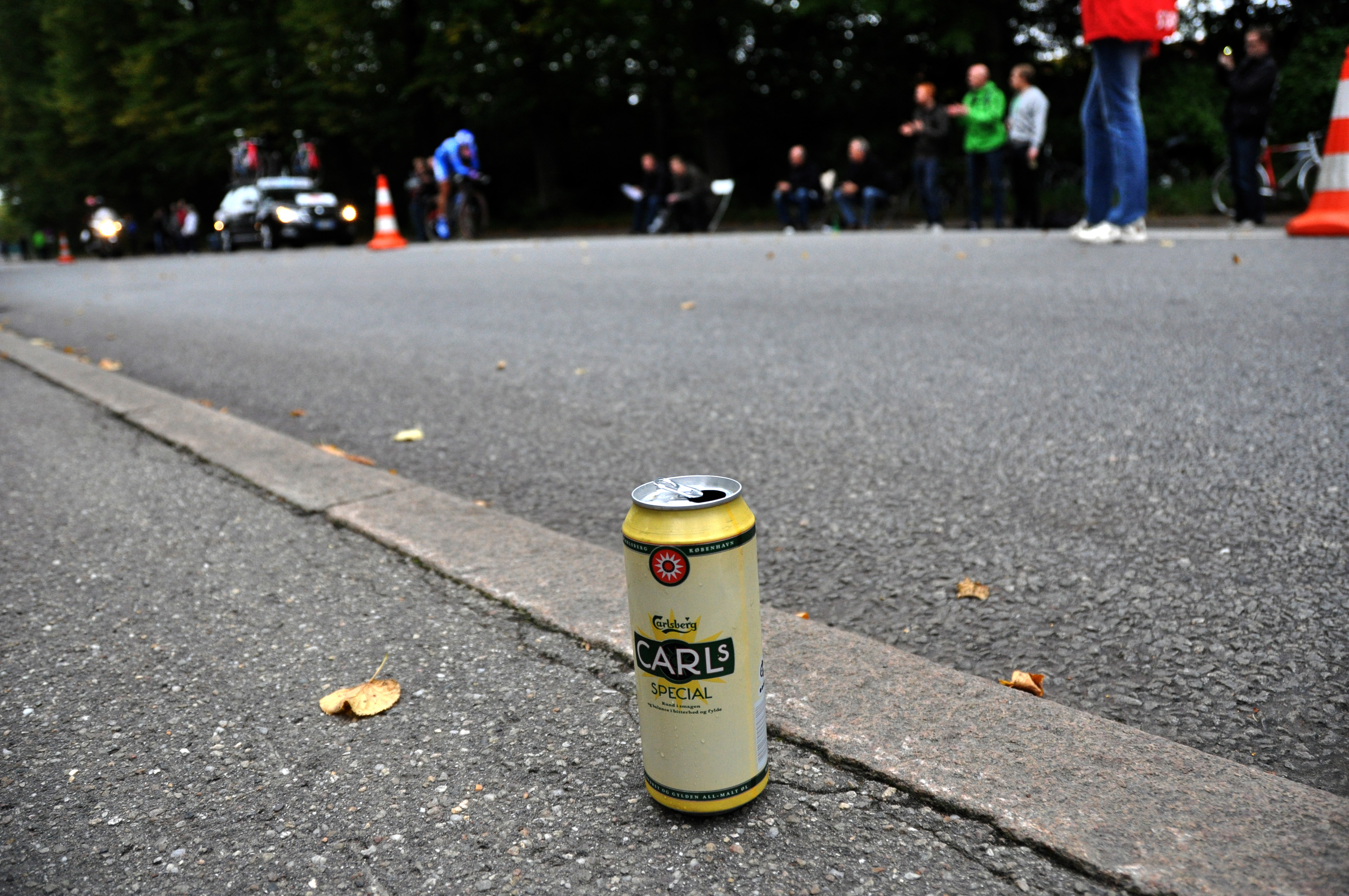
Carls Special Brew can.

At 7.5% alcohol (previously 9%, then 8% for a short time), Special Brew is part of a group of strong lagers that are termed "super-strength" in the UK and malt liquor in the USA. This beer is often associated with street alcoholics.

A single can (440mL) of Special Brew contains 3.5 units of alcohol (previously 4.5 units) whilst the maximum recommended daily intake for a man is two units. In January 2015, it was reported that Carlsberg would reduce the units per can to less than four, in line with a UK government pledge that no single can should contain more than four units. The change, a reduction either in the size of the can from 500mL to 440mL, or the alcoholic strength of the beer, was considered for implementation in 2015. Both changes were made; the cans have since been reduced to 440 mL, and the ABV reduced from 9% to 8%, then another drop to 7.5%.

=== Elephant beer ===
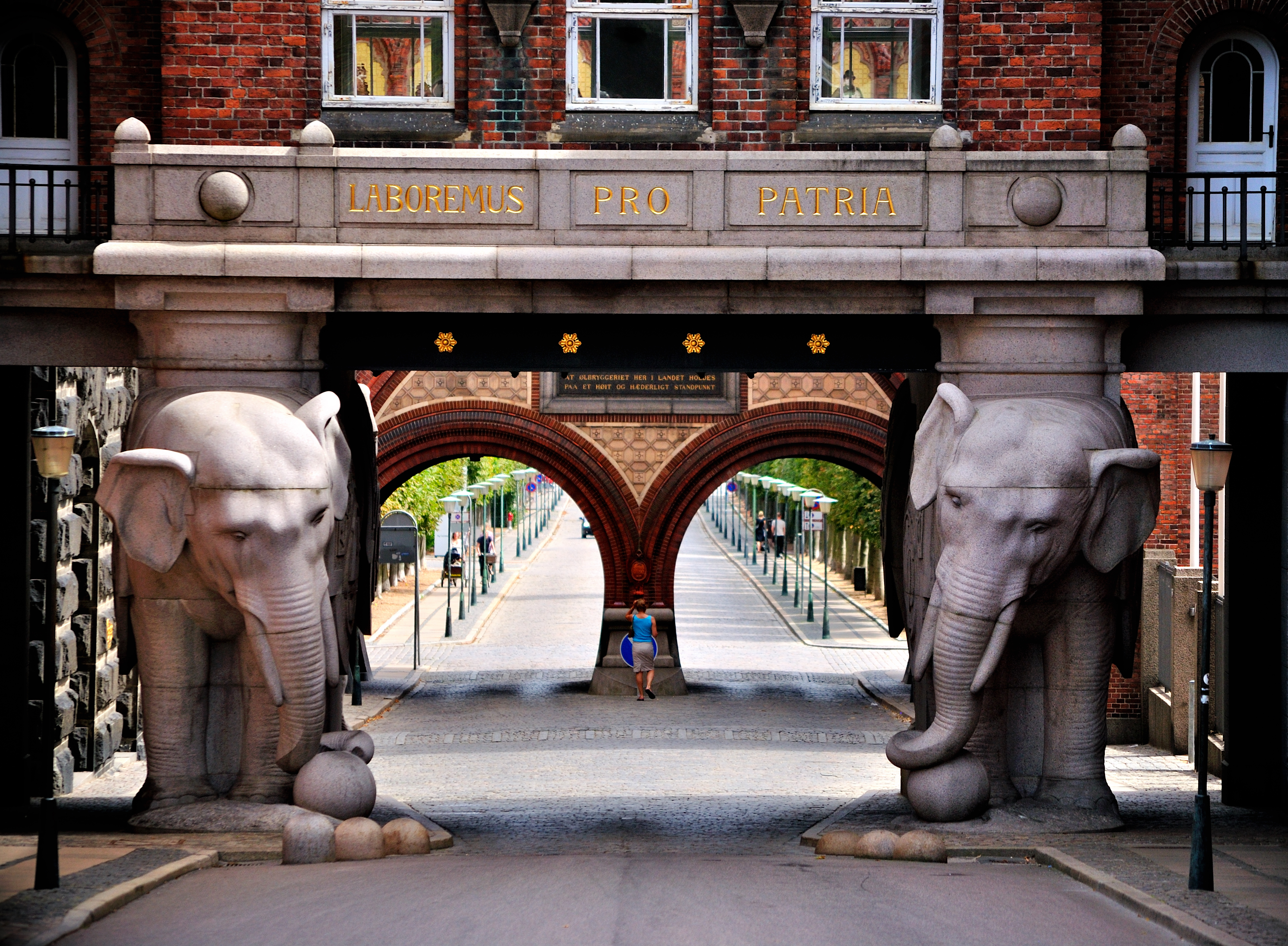
The Elephant Gate in Copenhagen, Denmark

In 1901, at brewer Carl Jacobsen's initiative, the Architect Professor J. L. Dahlerup created a tower resting on four elephants carved in granite from the Danish island of Bornholm. Jacobsen's inspiration was the obelisk supporting an elephant on the Piazza della Minerva in Rome. The four elephants each bear the initial of one of Carl Jacobsen's children: Theodora, Paula, Helge and Vagn. This became known as The Elephant Gate and is a landmark entrance to the brewery.

To the west of the gate, Carl Jacobsen's motto was inscribed: Laboremus pro Patria (Let us work for our country). Since then, the Elephant has been a famous part of the Carlsberg family, especially after the strong Elephant Beer was created in 1955 under the name Export Lager Beer featuring the Elephant label. The Elephant is still brewed in Carlsberg Breweries in Copenhagen and exported around the world. A few markets brew their own Carlsberg Elephant beer locally according to the original recipe.

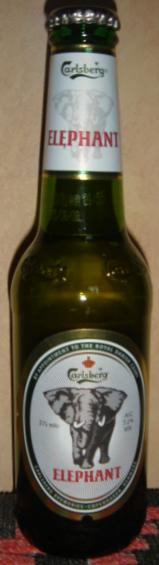
Elephant beer

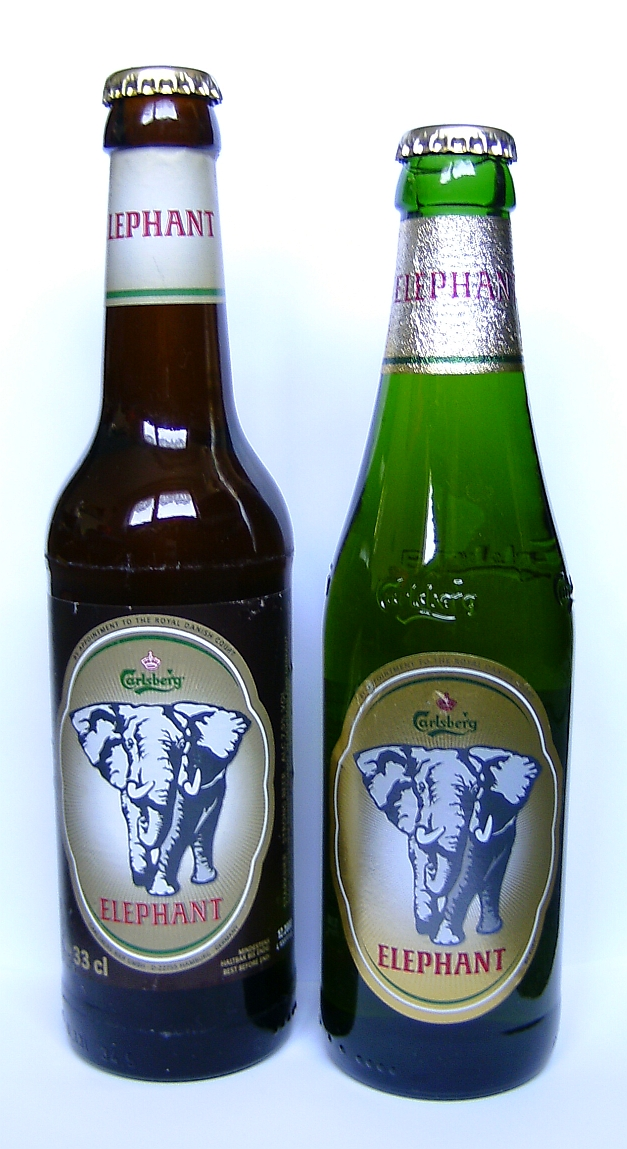
Old and new Elephant beer

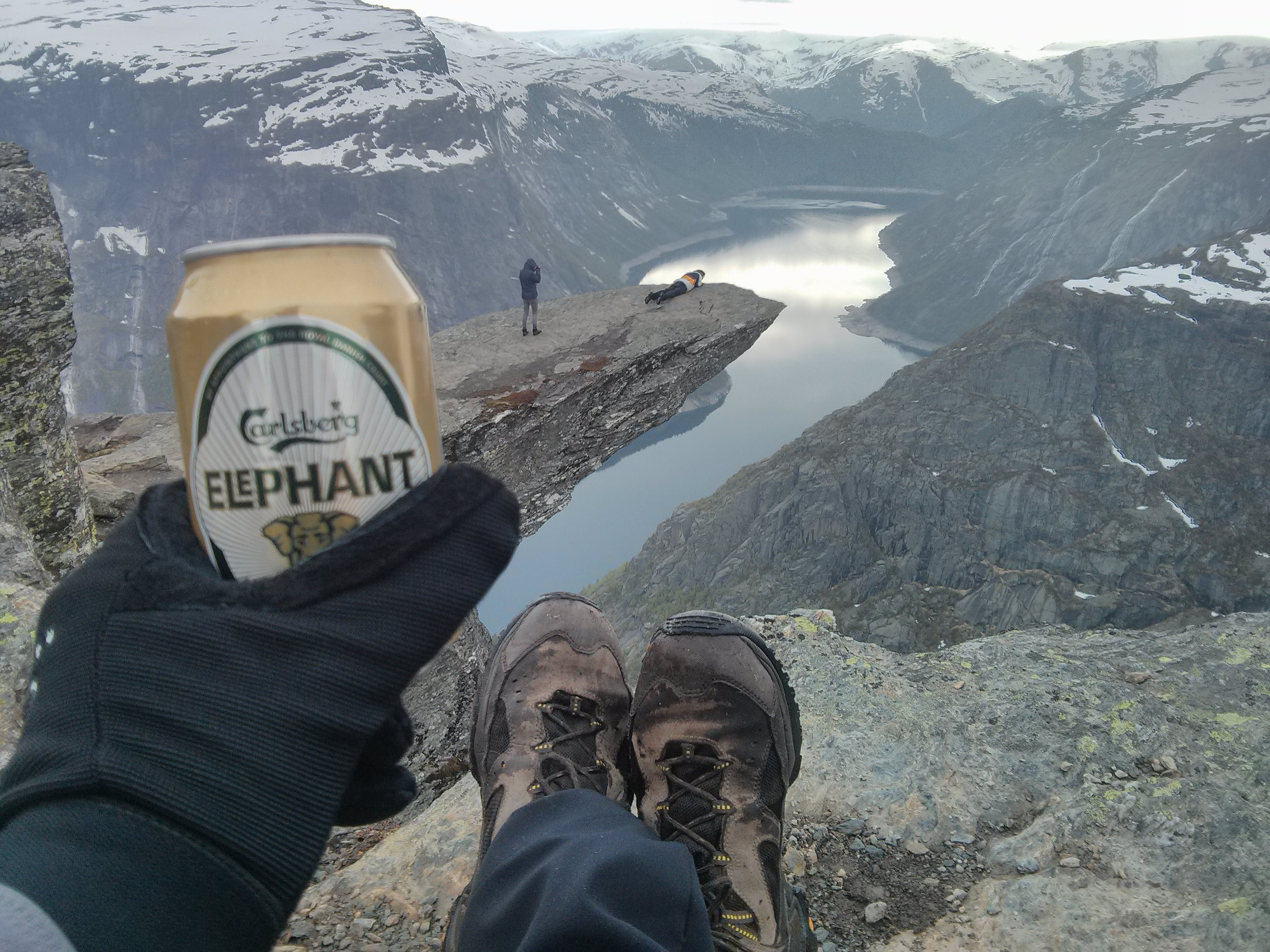
Elephant beer can

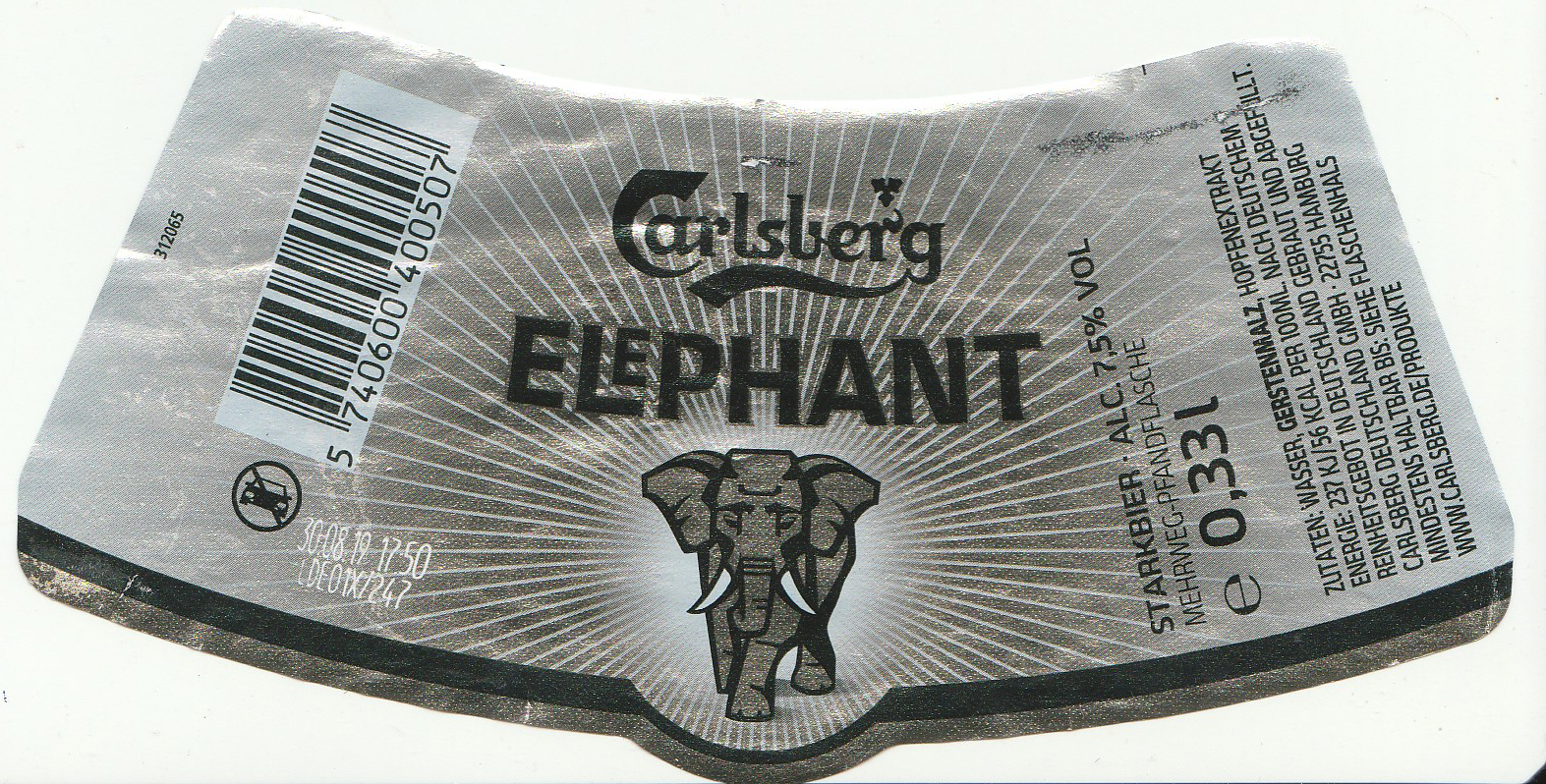
Elephant beer, Carlsberg Deutschland GmbH – Carlsberg ELePHANT

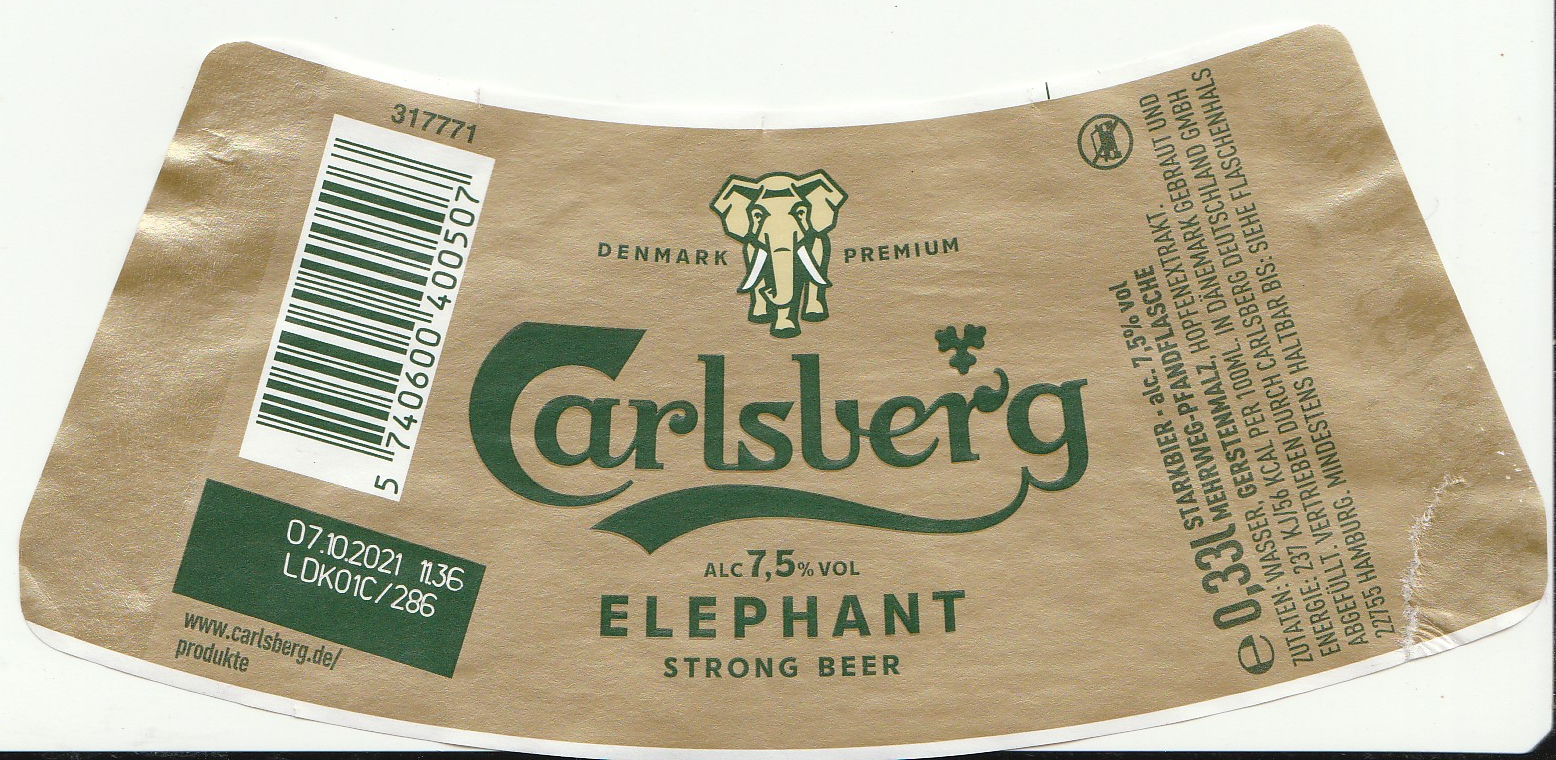
Elephant beer Carlsberg Deutschland GmbH – Carlsberg Elephant, 2020

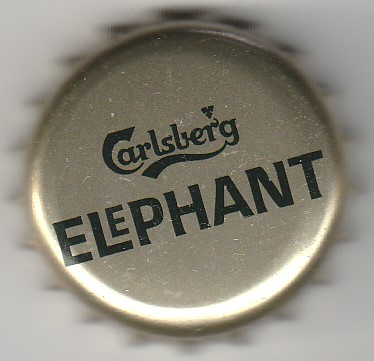
Elephant beer capsule, Cap of Carlsberg Deutschland GmbH – Carlsberg ELePHANT

=== Other brands in Carlsberg Group's portfolio ===
- E.C. Dahls (Norway)
- Farris (Norway)
- Falcon (Sweden)
- Feldschlösschen (Switzerland)
- Grimbergen (Belgium, International)
- Holsten (Germany, International)
- Jacobsen by Carlsberg (Denmark)
- Kronenbourg / 1664 (France, International)
- Lao (Laos)
- Lav (Serbia)
- Pan (Croatia)
- Lvivske (Ukraine)
- Mythos (Greece)
- Pripps Blå (Sweden)
- Ringnes (Norway)
- Slavutych (Ukraine)
- Solo (Norway)
- Somersby ciders by Carlsberg (Denmark, International)
- Super Bock (Portugal)
- Švyturys (Lithuania)
- Tetley's (United Kingdom, International)
- Tuborg by Carlsberg (Denmark, International)
- Neptun Brewery, Saltum and Neptun, (Saltum Rørkær/ Saltum & Neptun Bryggerier A/S, Saltum/ P. Holm Esbjerg, Rørkjær, Saltum-Houlbjerg) by Carlsberg (Denmark)
- (Kongens Bryghus) Christian IV Bryghus, Kings Brewery by Carlsberg (Denmark)
- Caleidoskope Brewing Company, Caleidoskope Brewing by Carlsberg (Denmark)
- Carlsberg Brand Store by Carlsberg (Denmark)
- Chaise Rouge Brewery, Chaise Rouge, Den Røde Stol, Nanobrewery by Carlsberg (Denmark)
- Crafted By (Carlsberg) by Carlsberg (Denmark)
- Coolship Brewing Company Viking Museum Ladby, Ladby, Kerteminde by Carlsberg (Denmark)
- Coolship Brewing Company by Carlsberg (Denmark)
- Skands Brewery/ Skands Microbrewery (Skands Bryggeri/ Skands Mikrobryggeri) (Bryggeriet Skands, Skands, Brøndby), micro brewery by Carlsberg (Denmark)
- Semper Ardens by Carlsberg (Denmark)
- Wiibroe Brewery by Carlsberg (Denmark)
- Wiibroe Brewery, Copenhagen and Helsingør, Capital Region, Microbrewery by Carlsberg (Denmark)
- C. Wiibroe's Craft Brewery by Carlsberg (Denmark)
- Microbrewery of Wiibroe Friends Copenhagen and Helsingør by Carlsberg (Denmark)
- Star Brewery, (Bryggeriet Stjernen, Bryggeriet Stjernens Studiefond), by Carlsberg (Denmark)
- House of Beer, House of Beer A/S by Carlsberg (Denmark)
- Houlbjerg Bryggeri, (Saltum Houlbjerg Bryggeri A/S), (Houlbjerg Bryggeri A/S) by Carlsberg (Denmark)
- Jacobsen/ Husbryggeriet Jacobsen, Jacobsen, Husbryggeriet (Carlsberg), Valby by Carlsberg (Denmark)
- Nordlands (Norway)
- Coca-Cola licenses from USA with Carlsberg Denmark.
- Monster Energy drink licenses from USA with Carlsberg Denmark.
- Tuborg squash soda.
- Carlsberg sport soda.

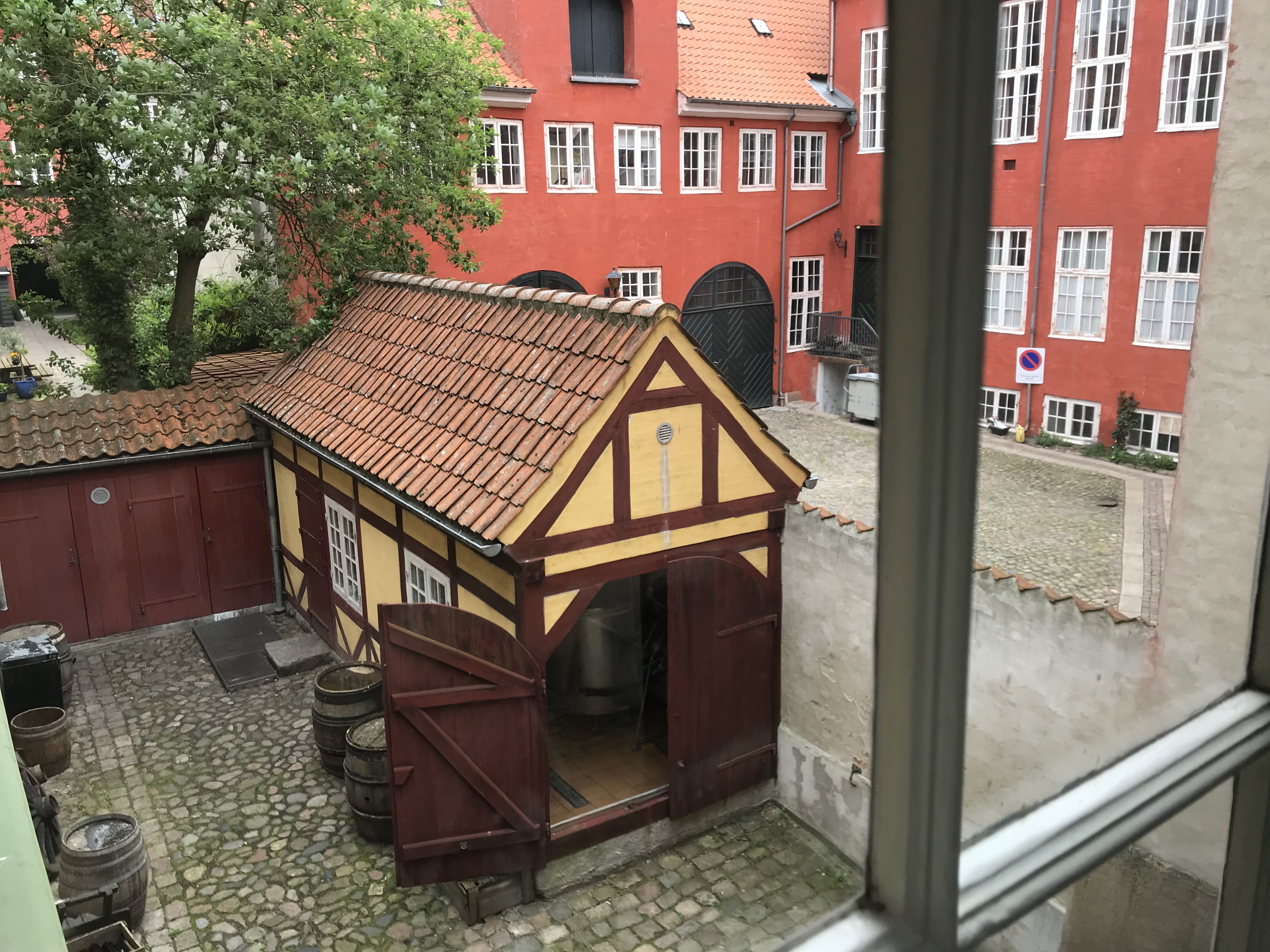
Microbrewery of Wiibroe Friends in the backyard of Skibsklarerergaarden in Helsingør in (Denmark).

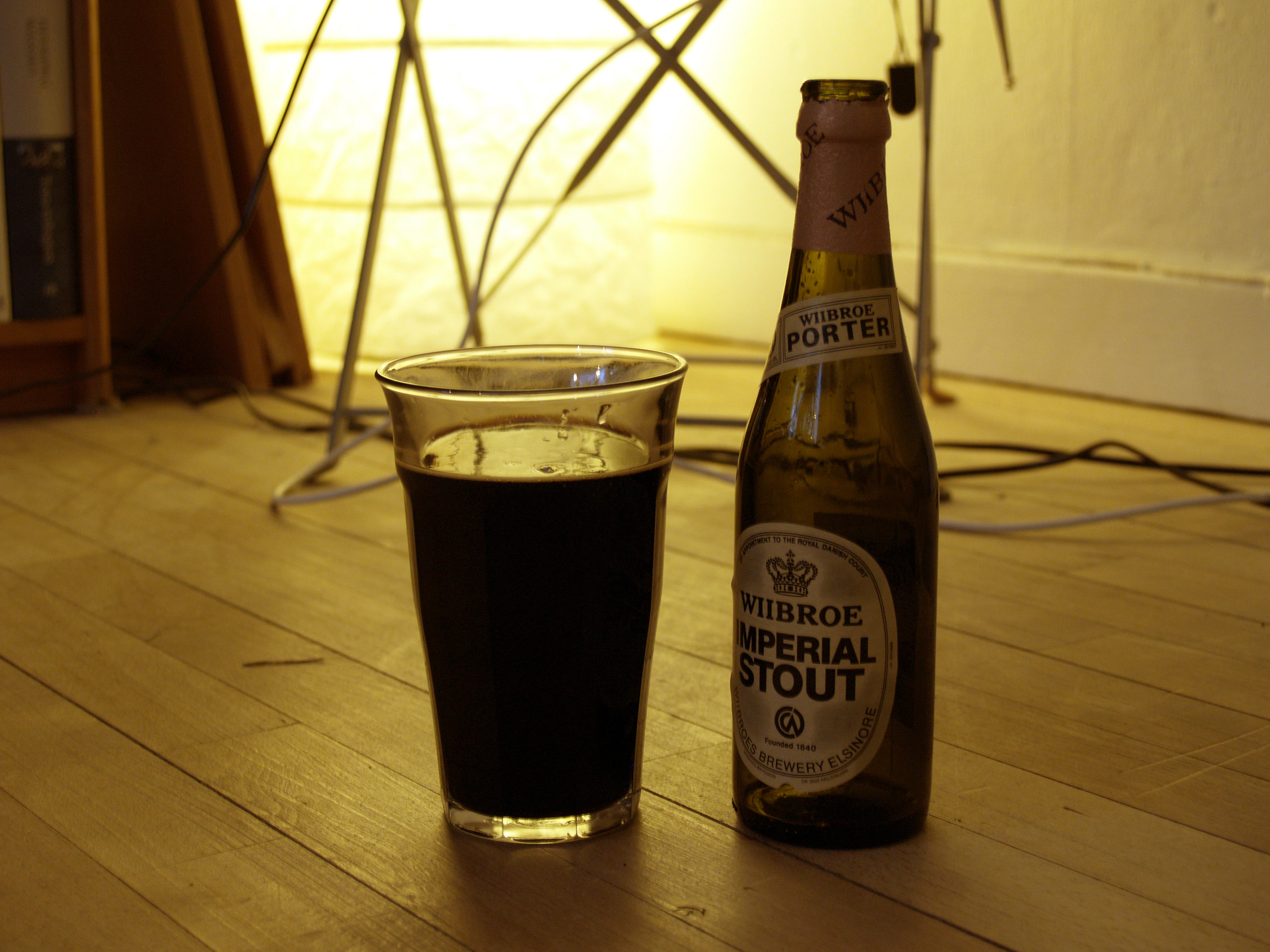
Wiibroe beer

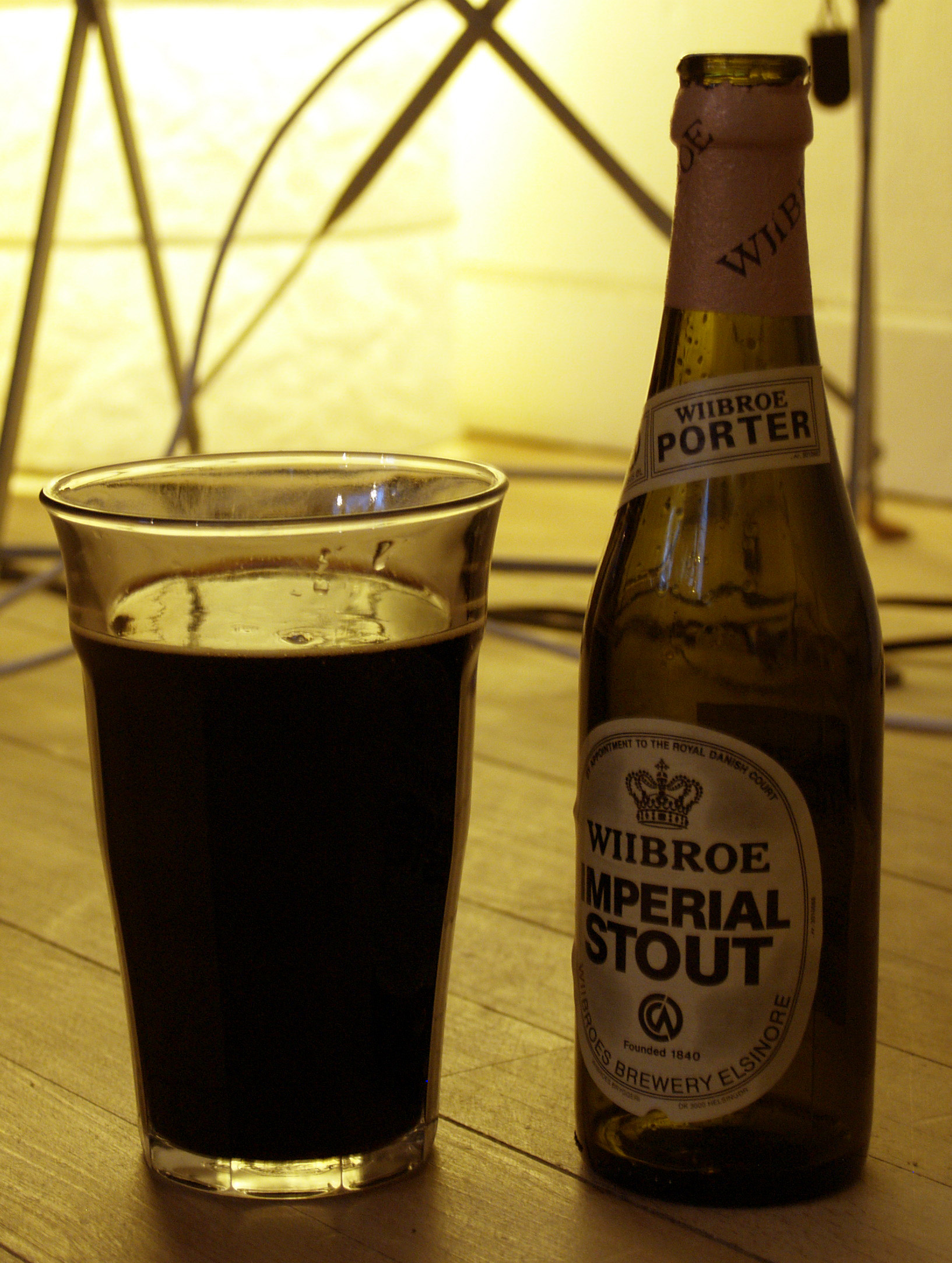
Wiibroe Imperial stout

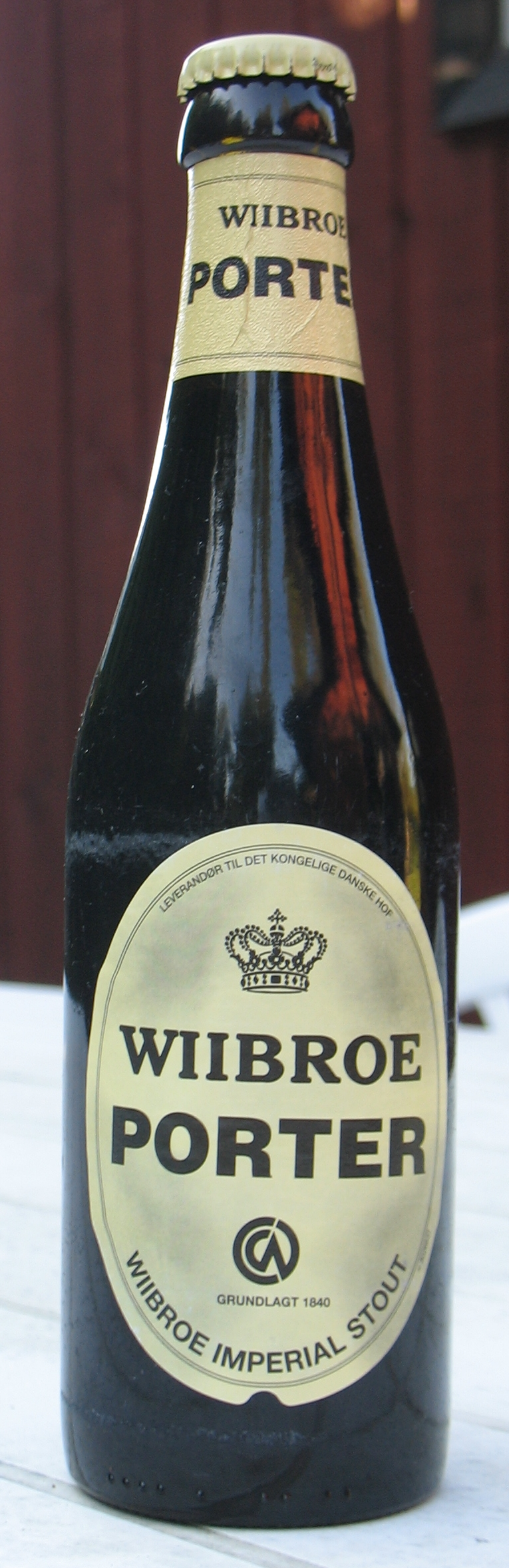
Wiibroe Porter

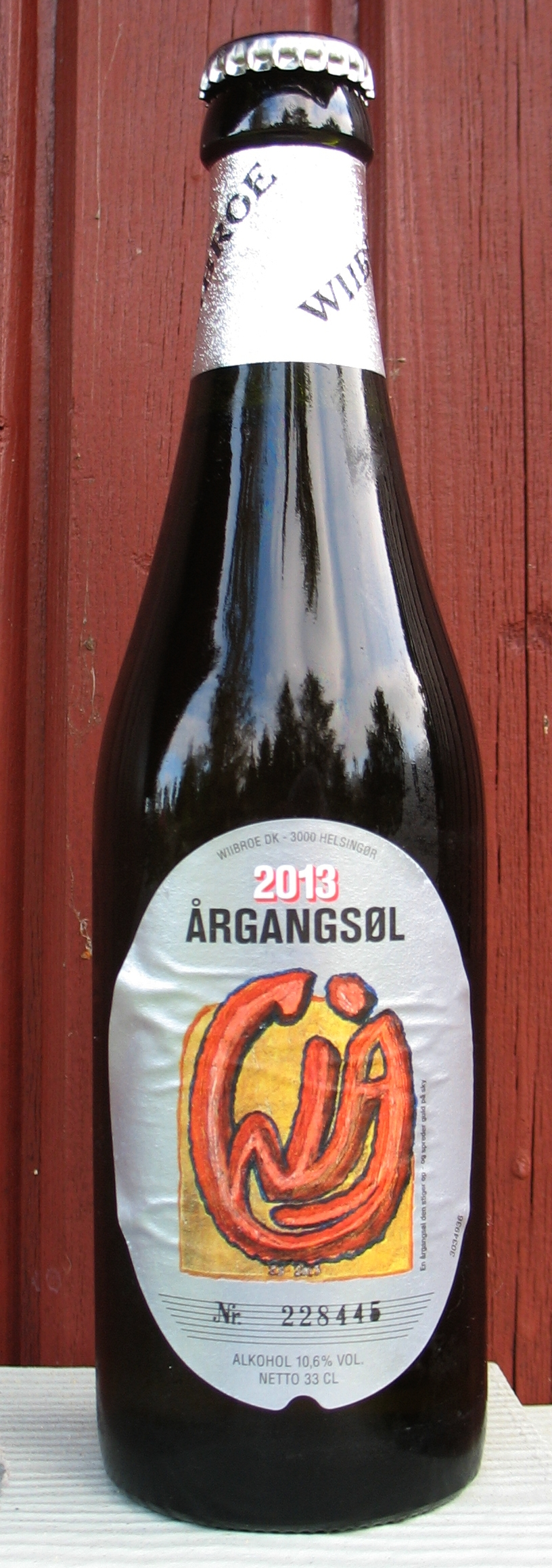
Wiibroe Vintage beer 2013

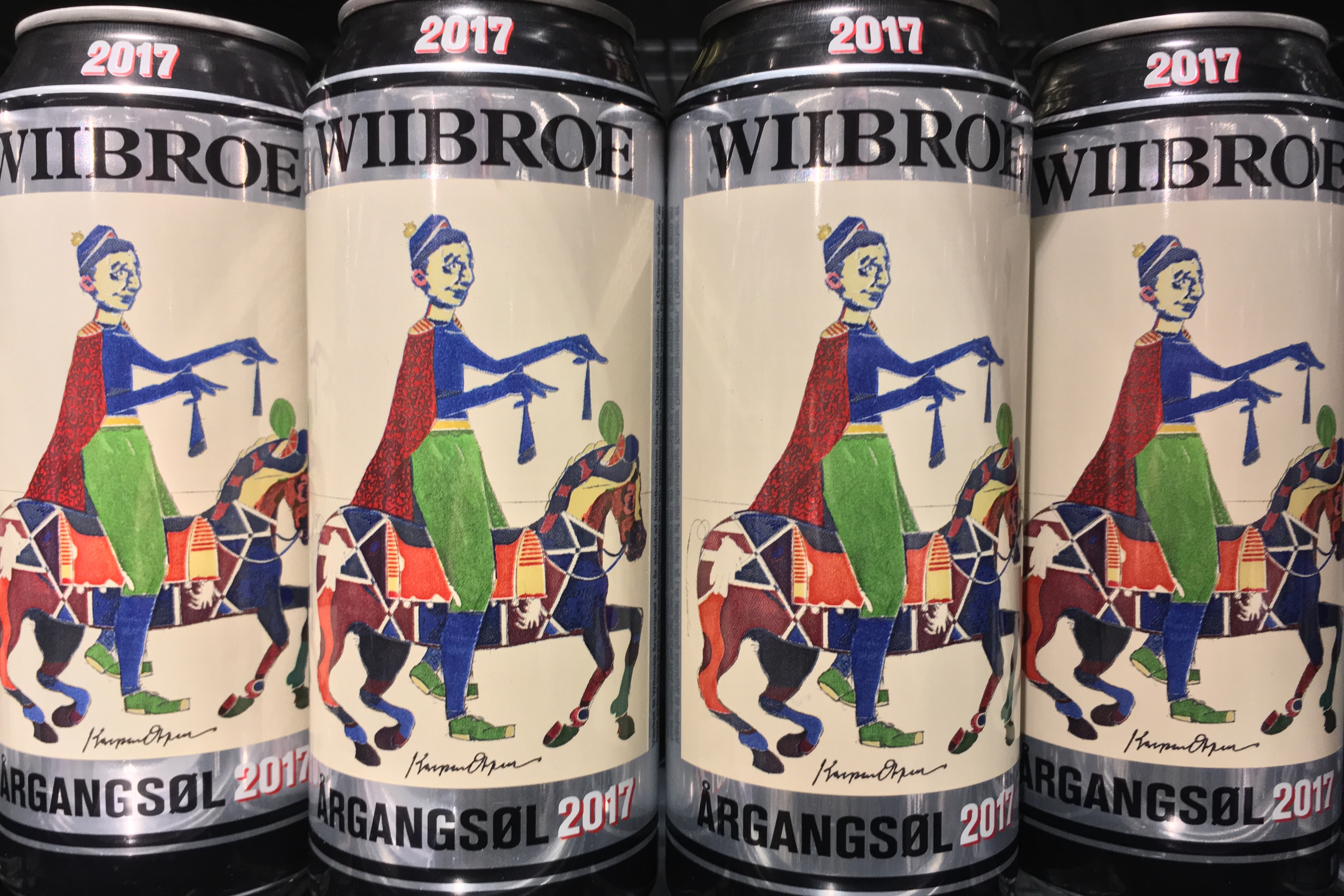
Wiibroe Vintage beer 2017

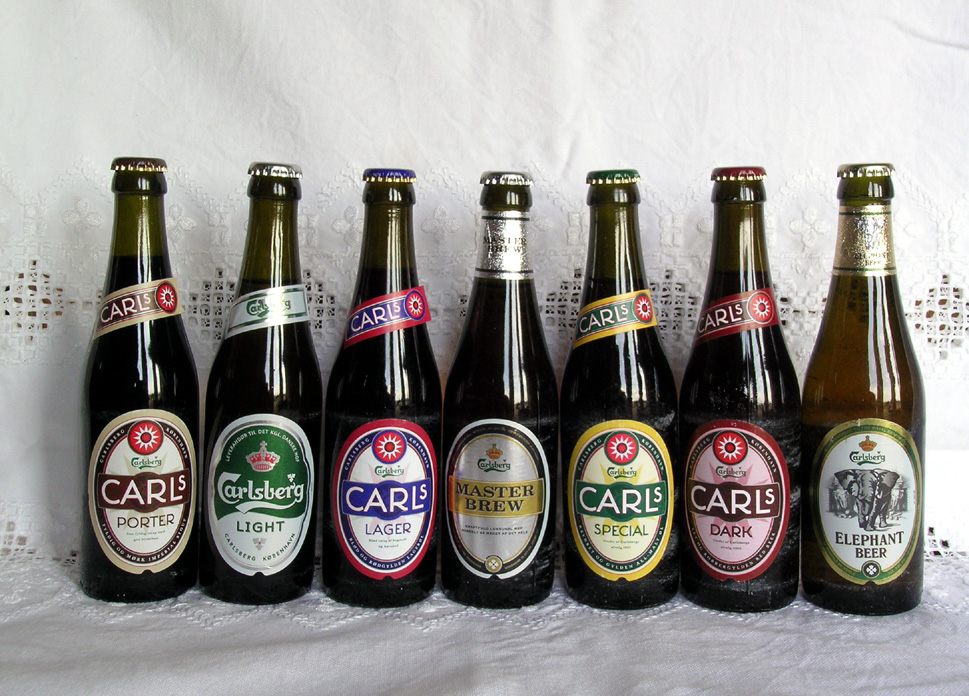
Carlsberg beers

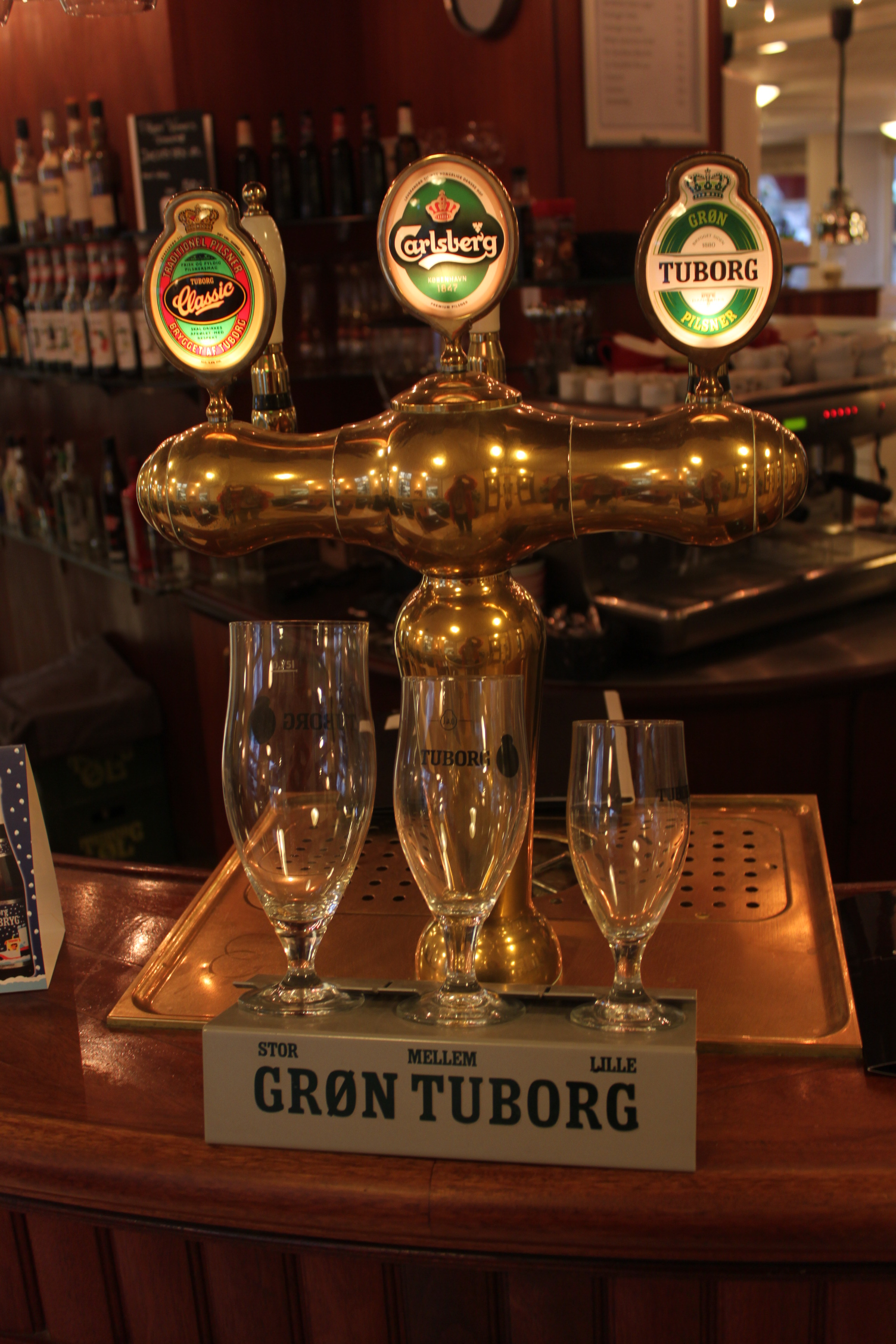
Carlsberg beers

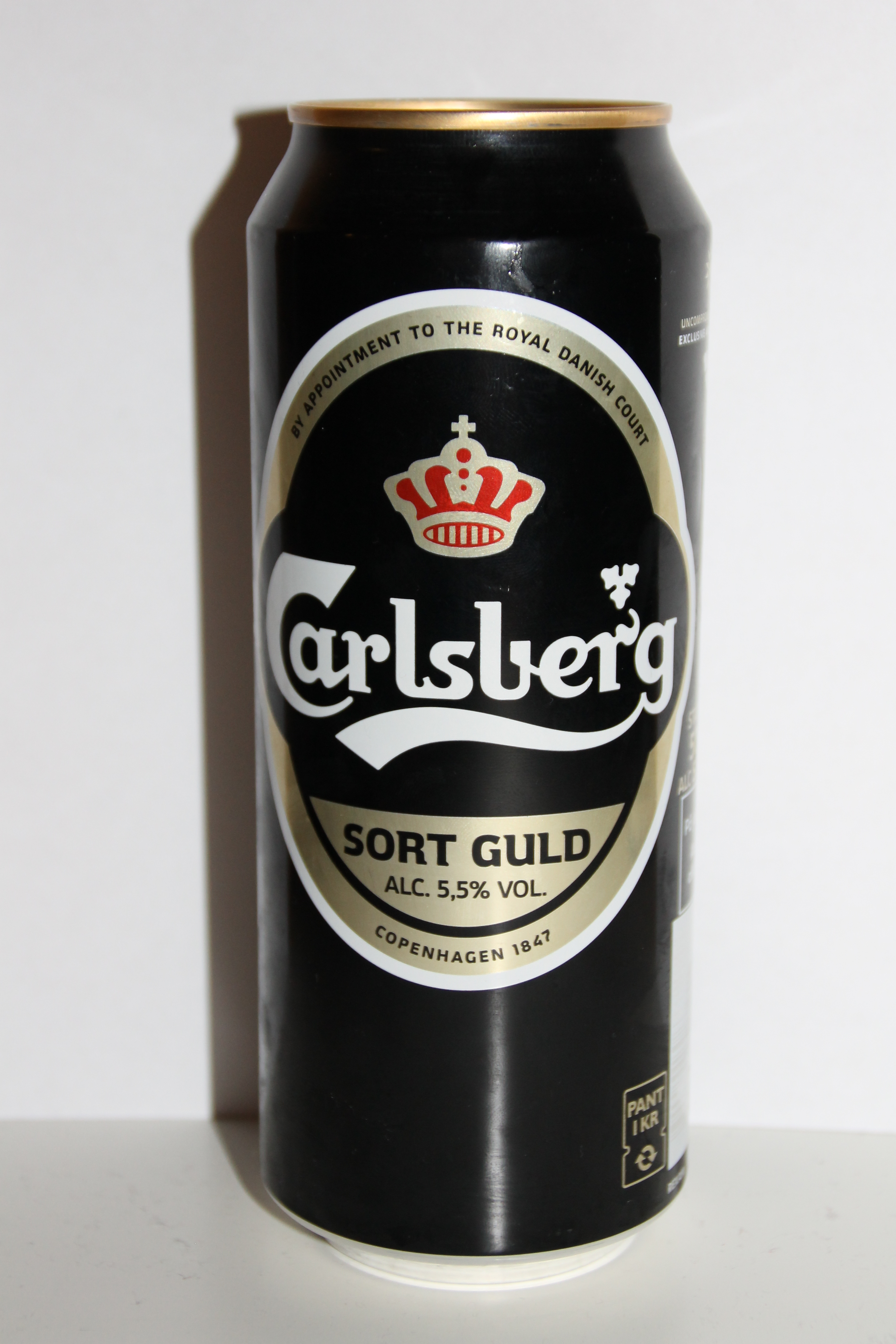
Carlsberg Black Gold 5,5%

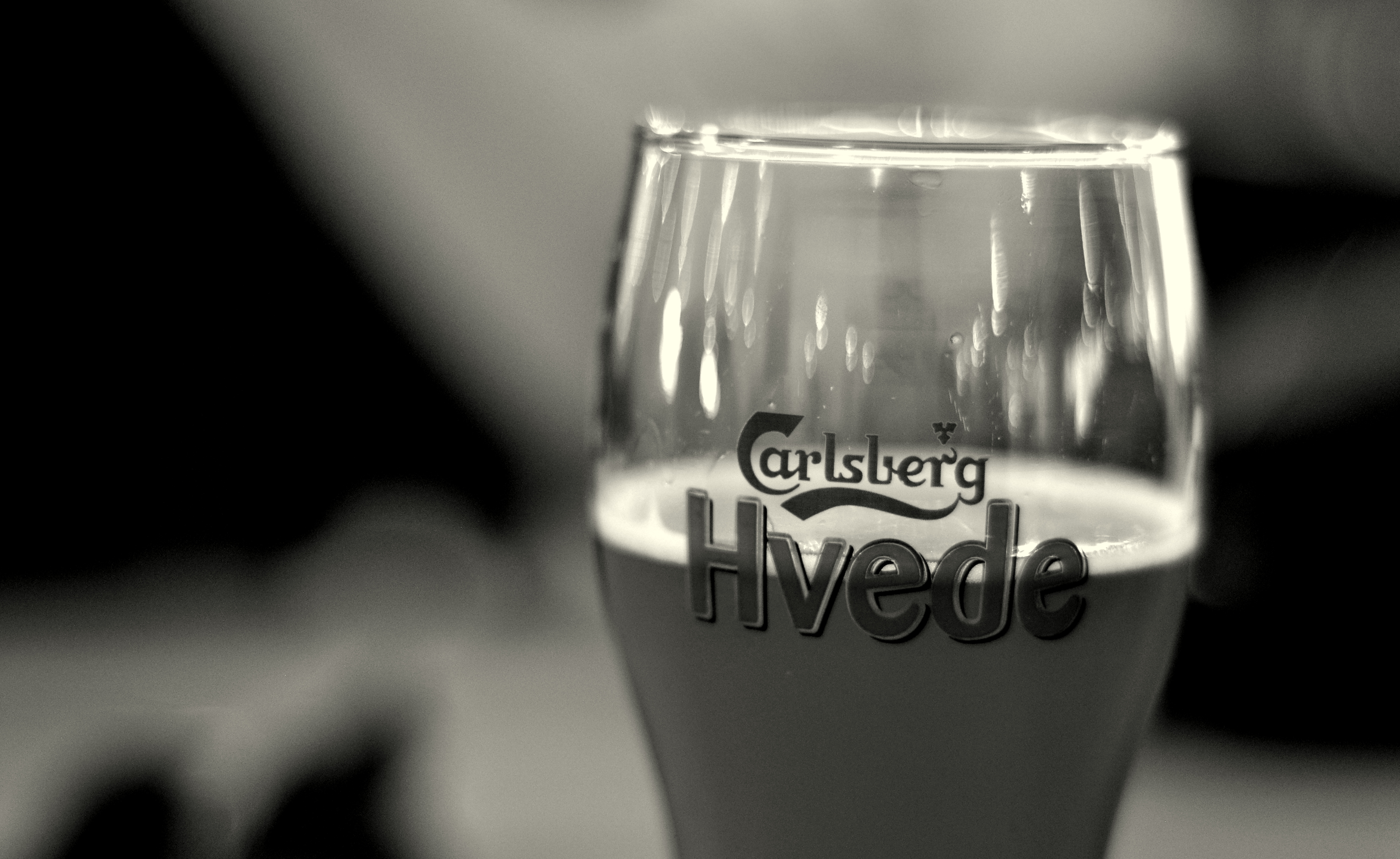
Carlsberg-Jacobsen, wheat beer

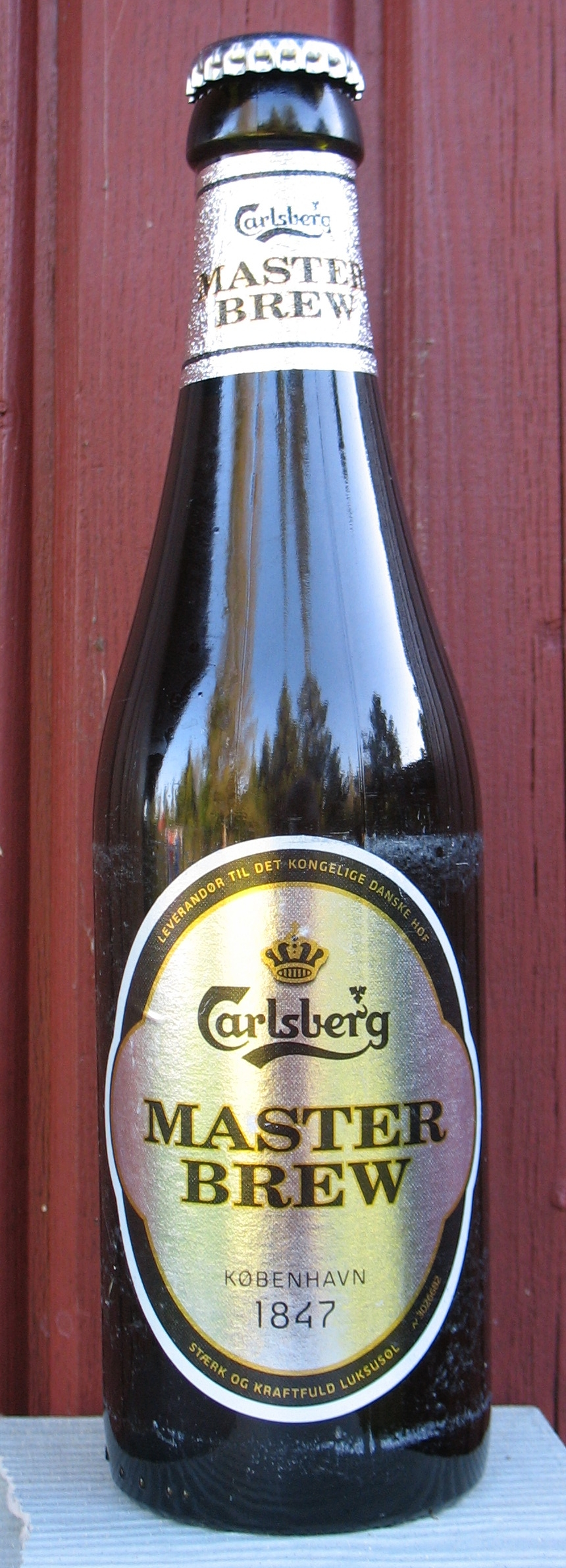
Carlsberg Master Brew

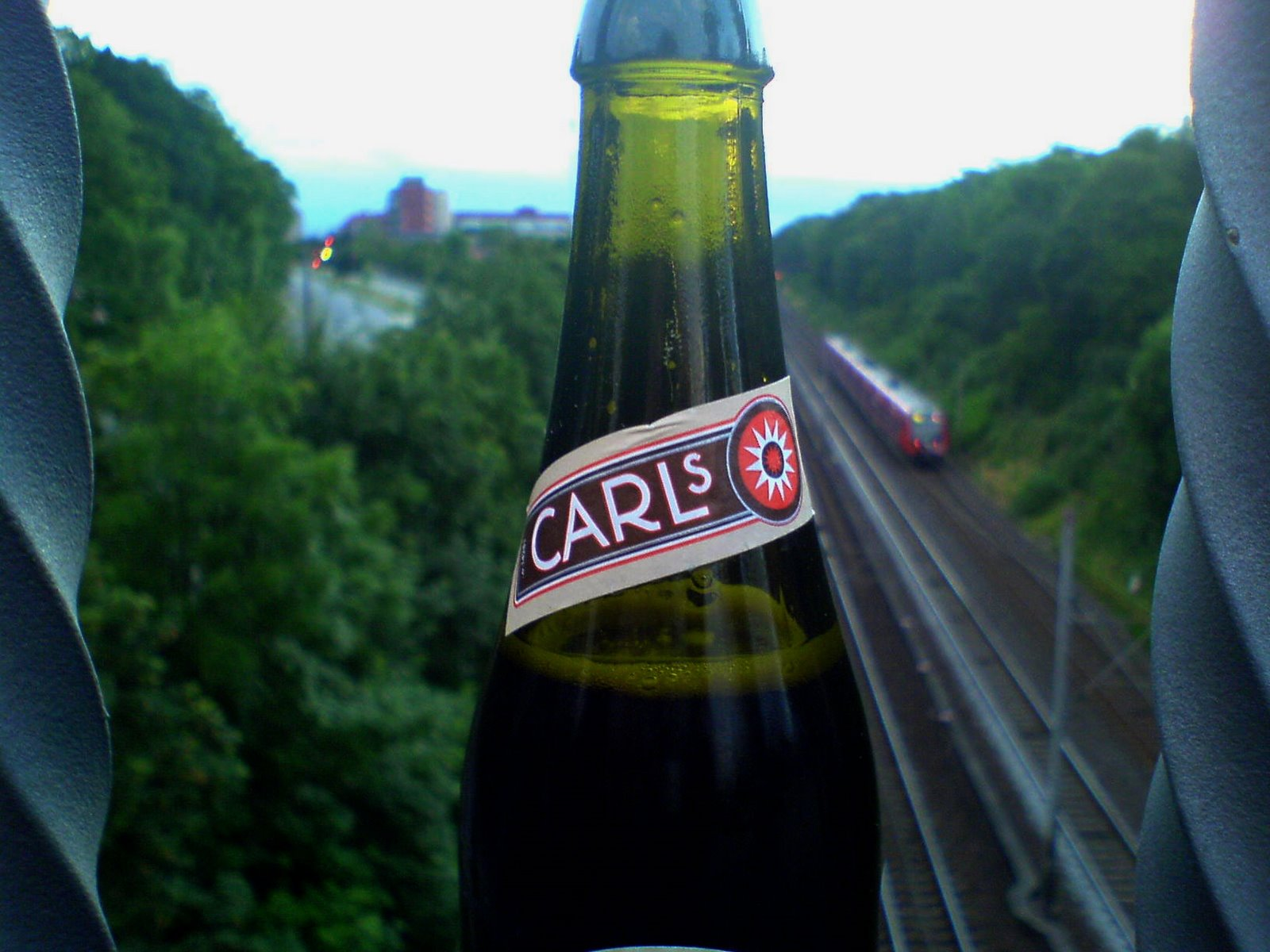
Carls Beer

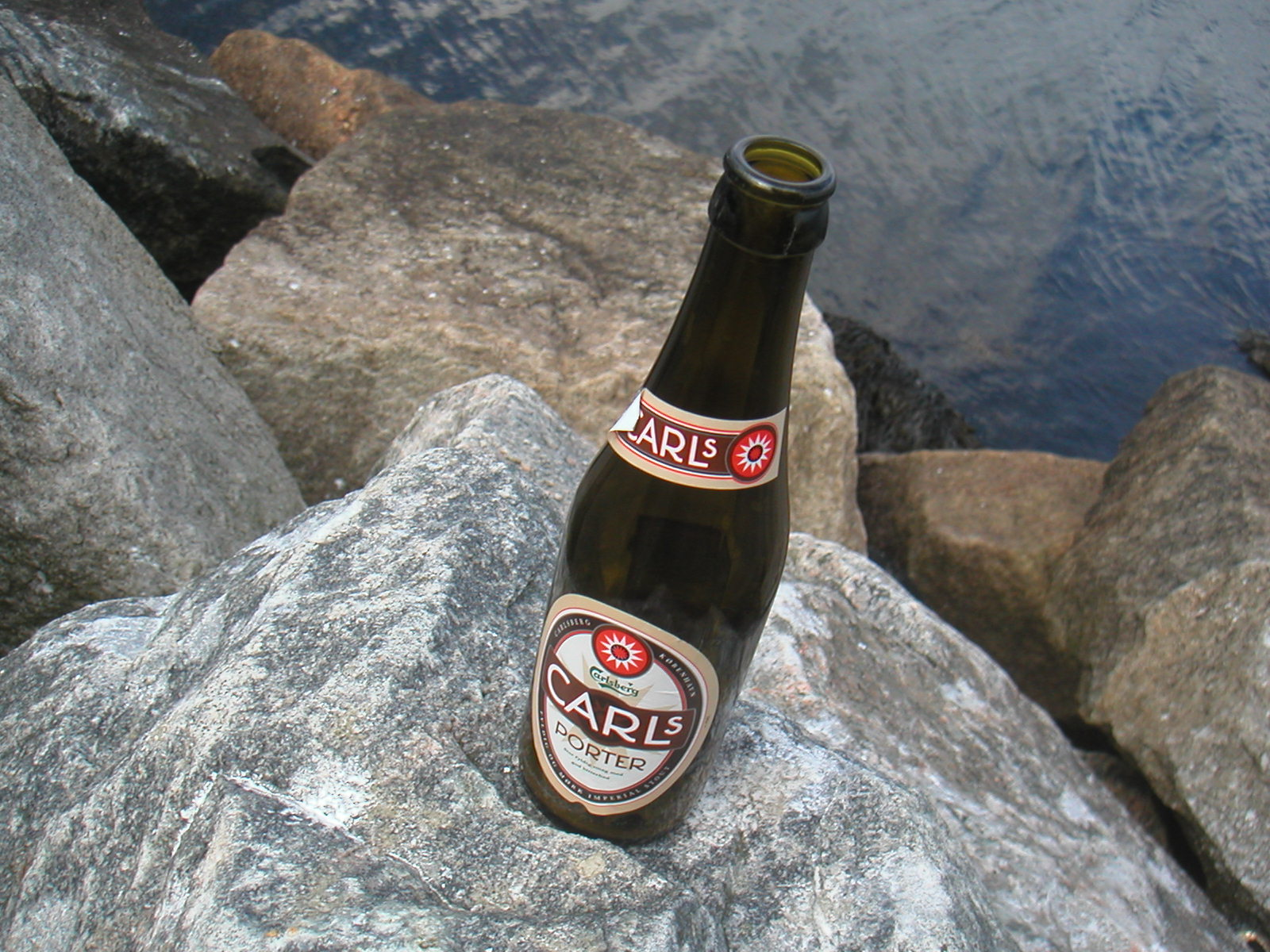
Carls Porter

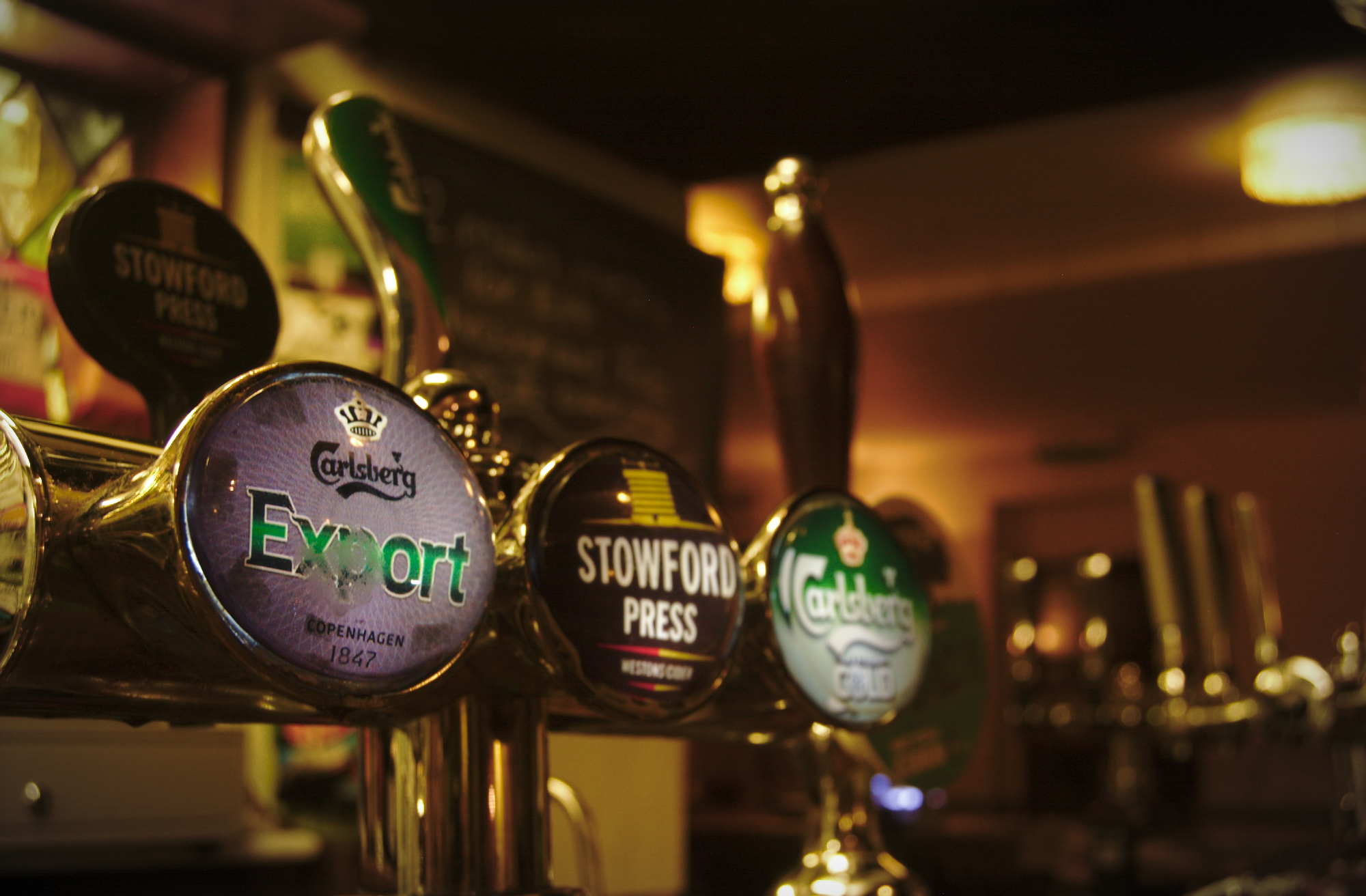
Carlsberg Export and Carlsberg Cold beer

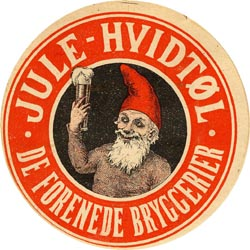
Kings Brewery Christmas beer (hvidtøl) by Carlsberg

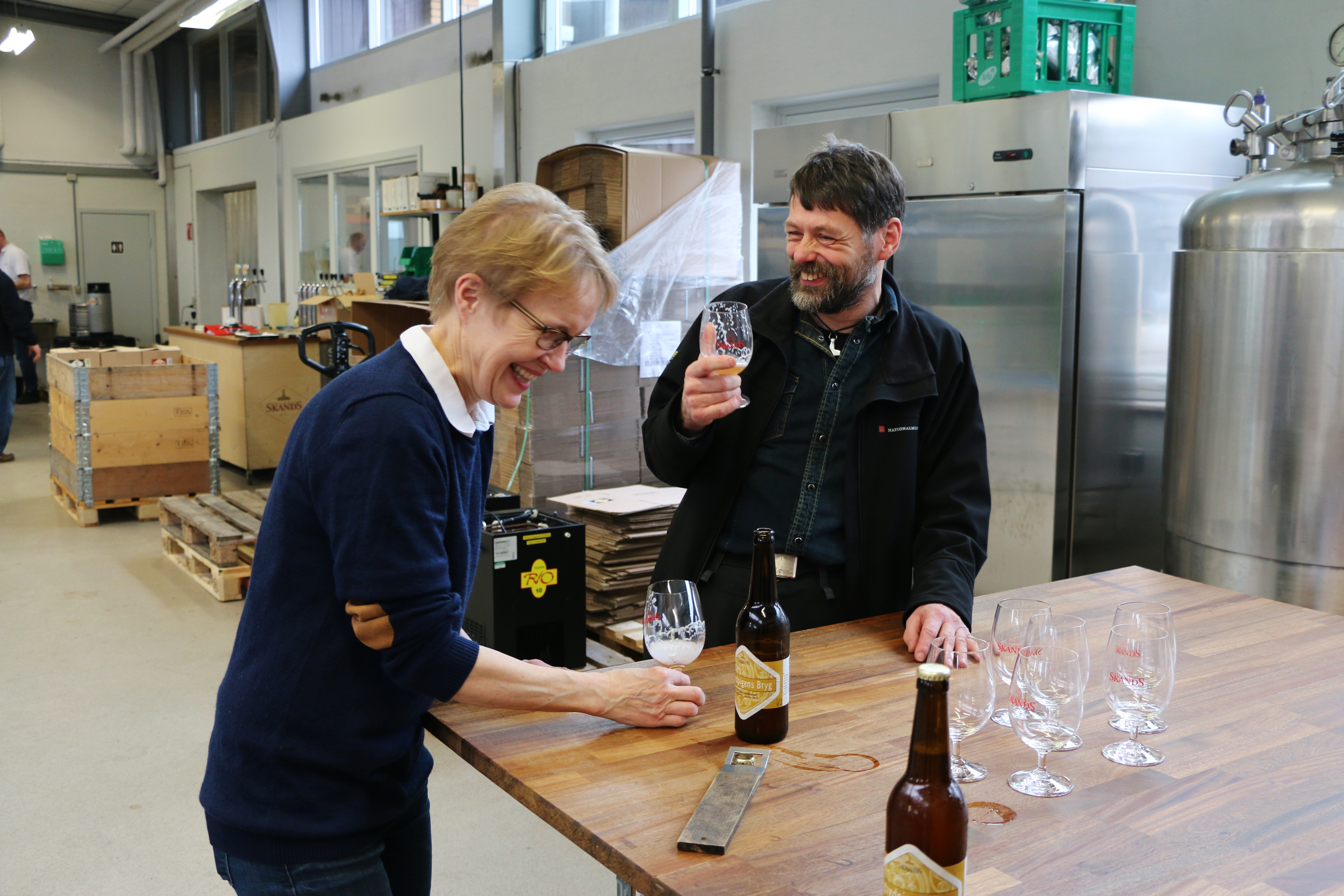
Skands beer from Skands Brewery/ Skands Microbrewery (Skands Bryggeri/ Skands Mikrobryggeri) (Bryggeriet Skands, Skands by Carlsberg

In total, Carlsberg Group brews more than 500 different beers.

== Visitors centre ==
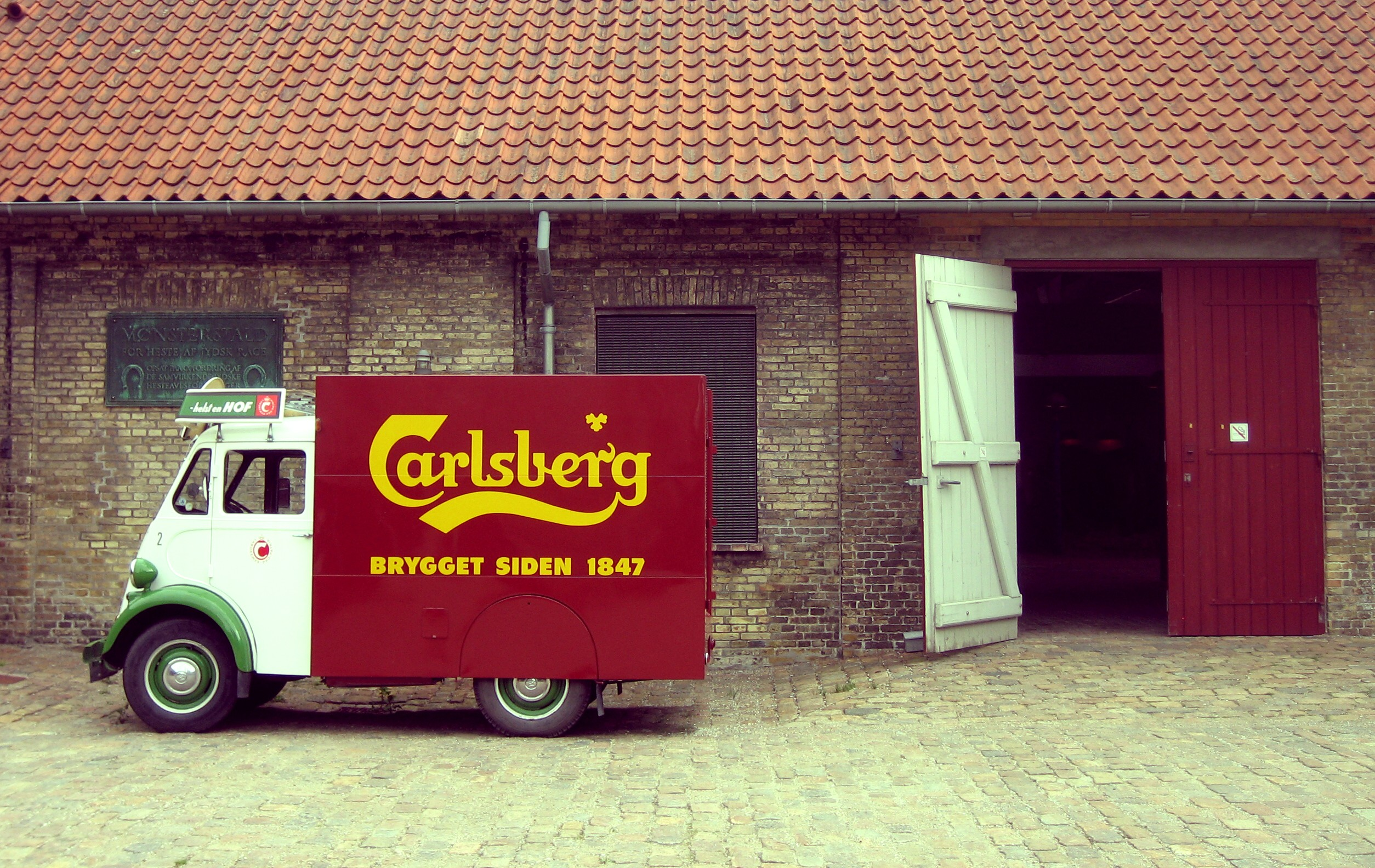
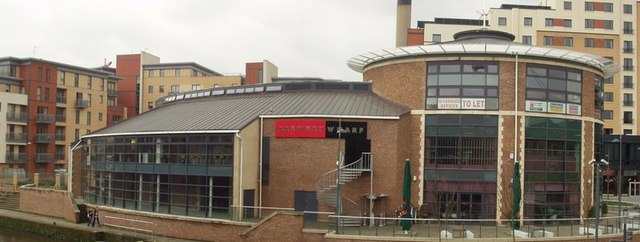
The old and new Carlsberg Visitors Centre, respectively.

The Carlsberg Visitors Centre is located at 11 Gamle Carlsberg Vej, 2500 Valby, Denmark at the location of the first Carlsberg Brewery. In the courtyard is a smaller replica of the Little Mermaid Statue that Carl Jacobsen donated to Copenhagen. Also located in connection with the Carlsberg visitors Centre is the Jacobsen House Brewery, a micro brewery creating the Jacobsen speciality range of hand-crafted beers. The entry ticket includes a free drink at the bar. Visit Carlsberg is located a five-minute walk from the Carlsberg train station.

Photographs of wagons featured as exhibits at the museum

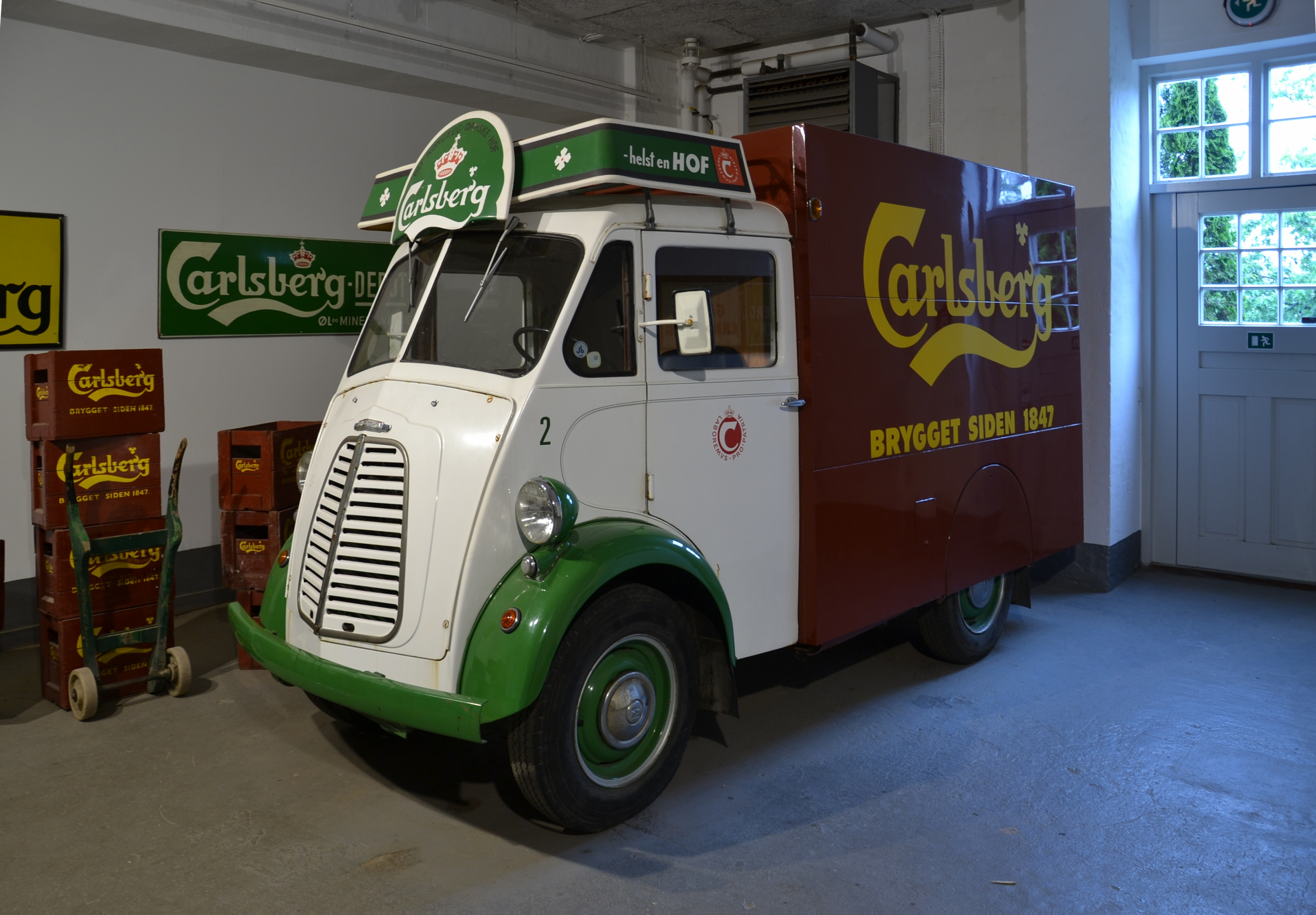

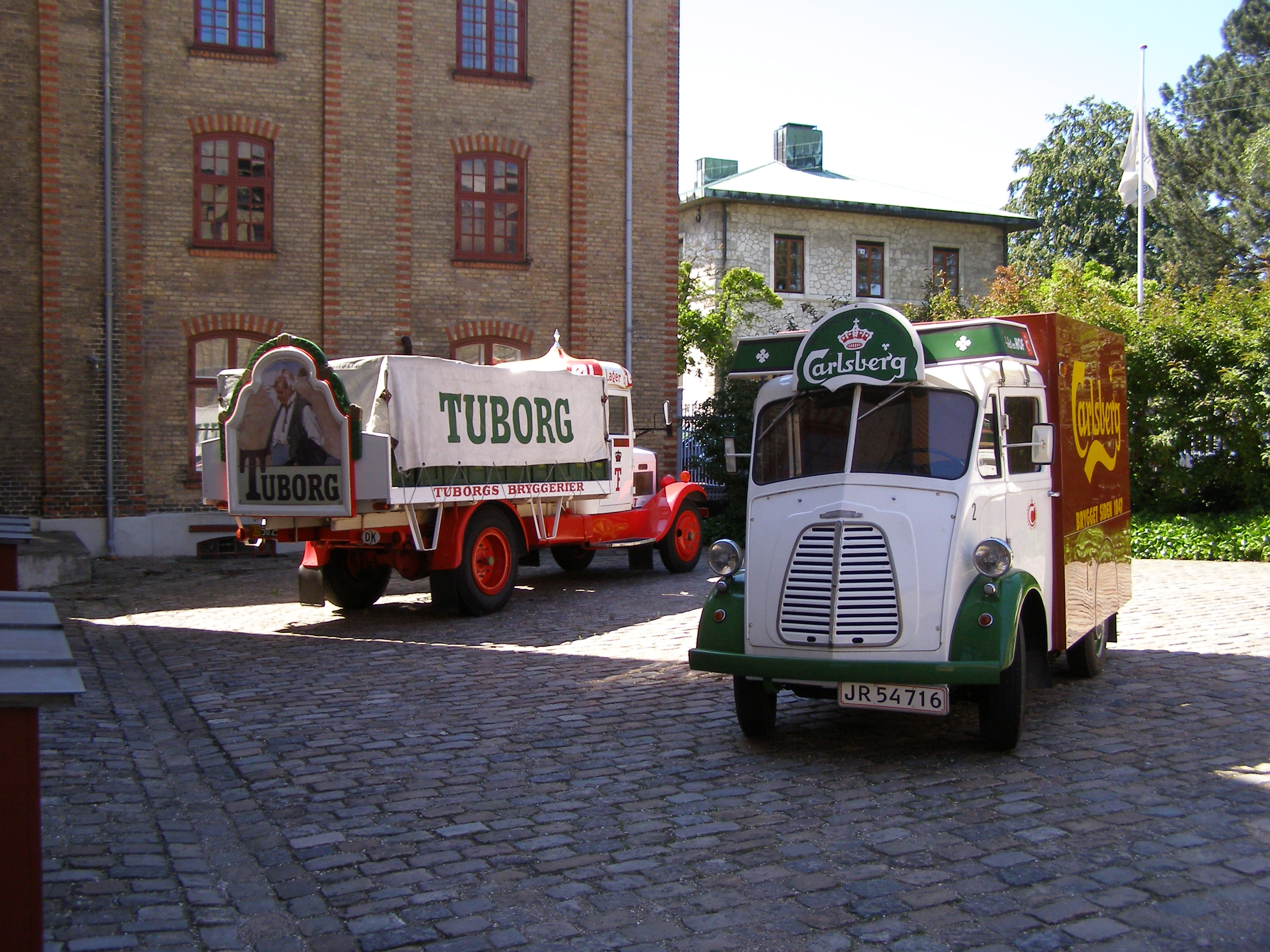

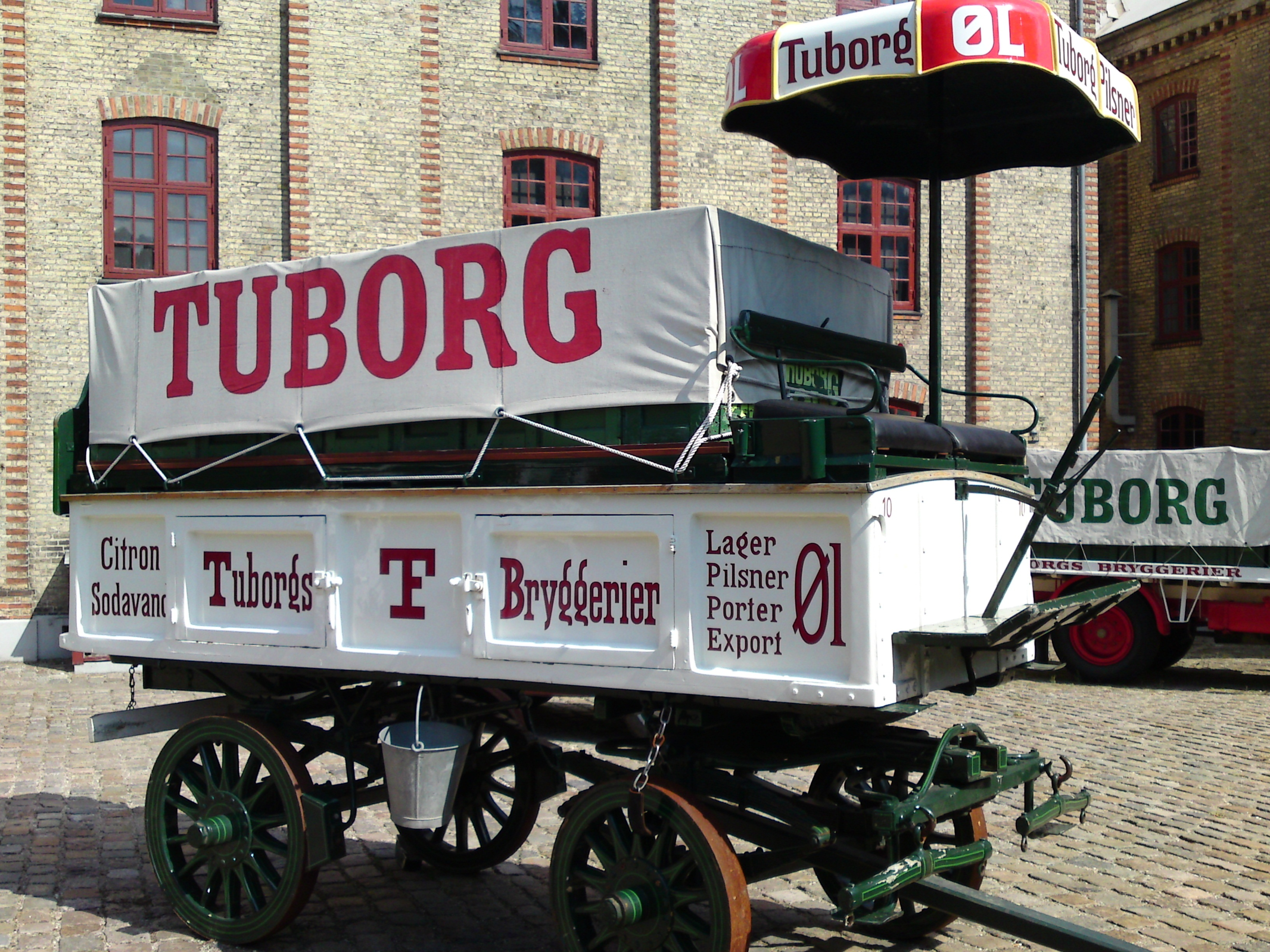

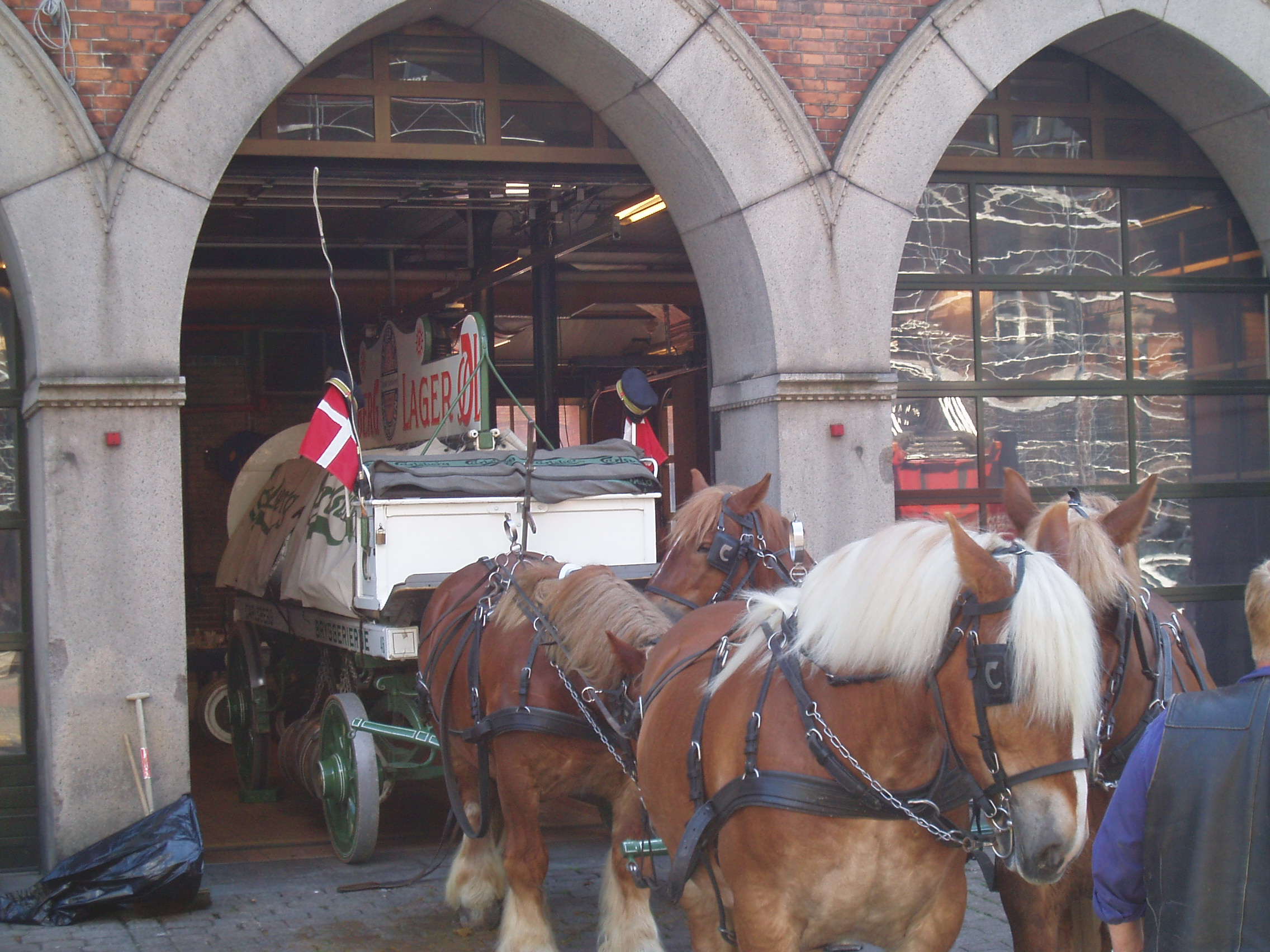

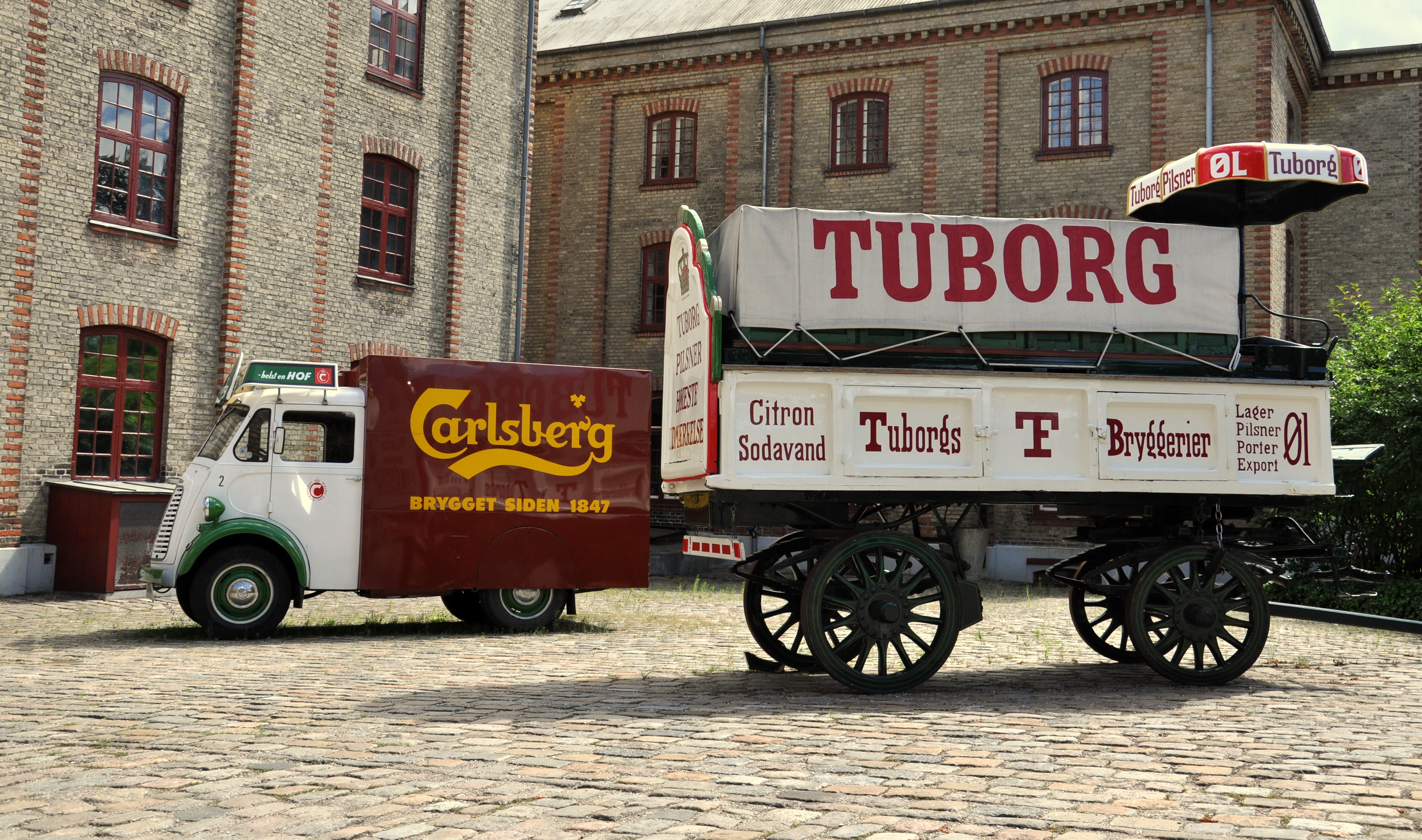

== Advertising ==
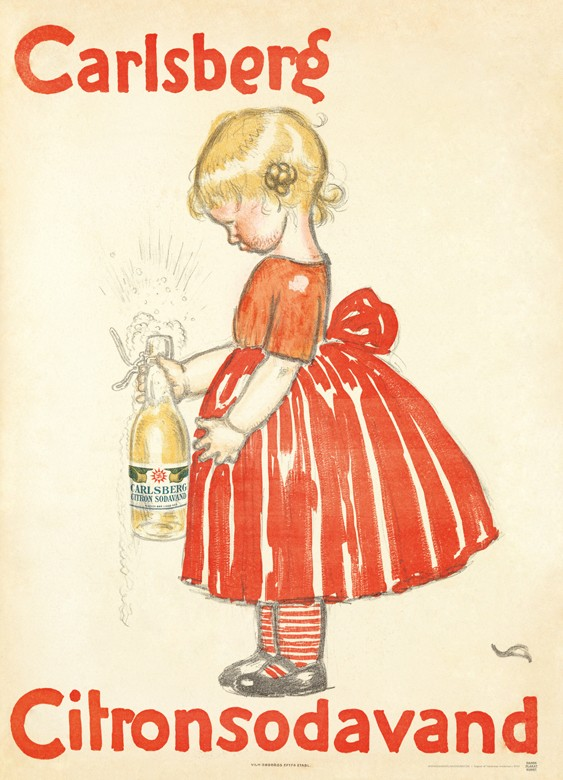
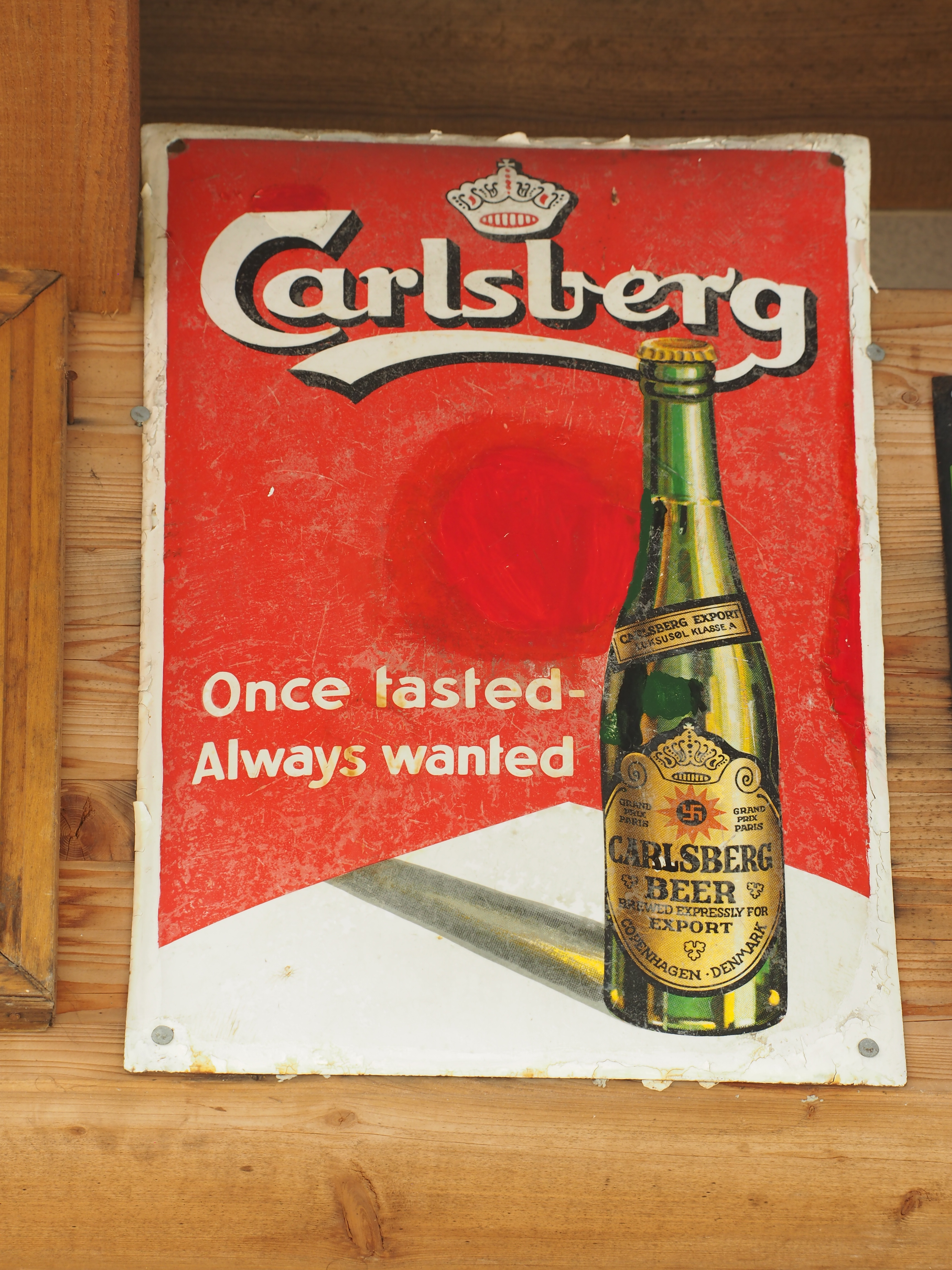
Advertisement signs originating from the early 20th century
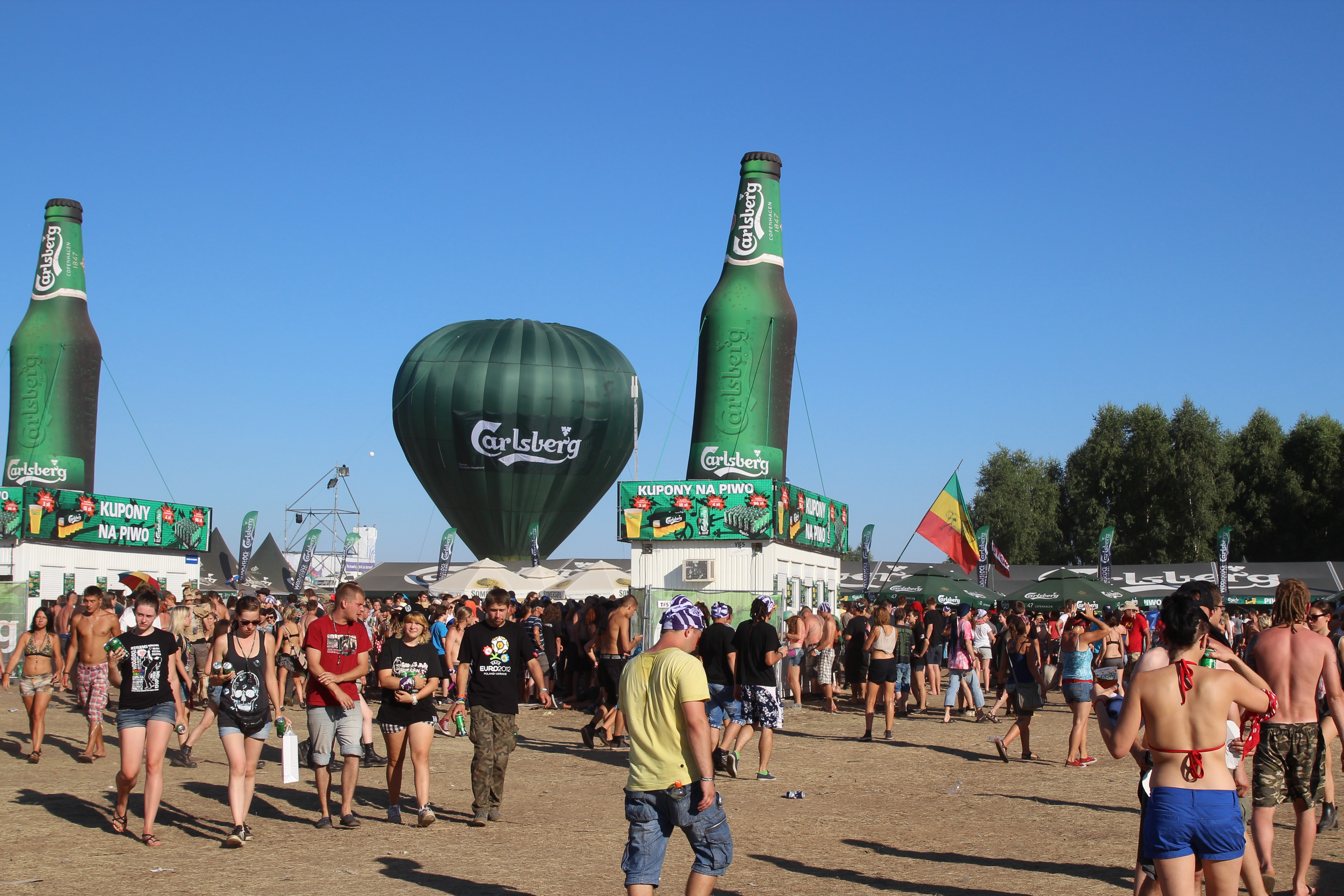
Carlsberg advertising at Woodstock Festival, Poland

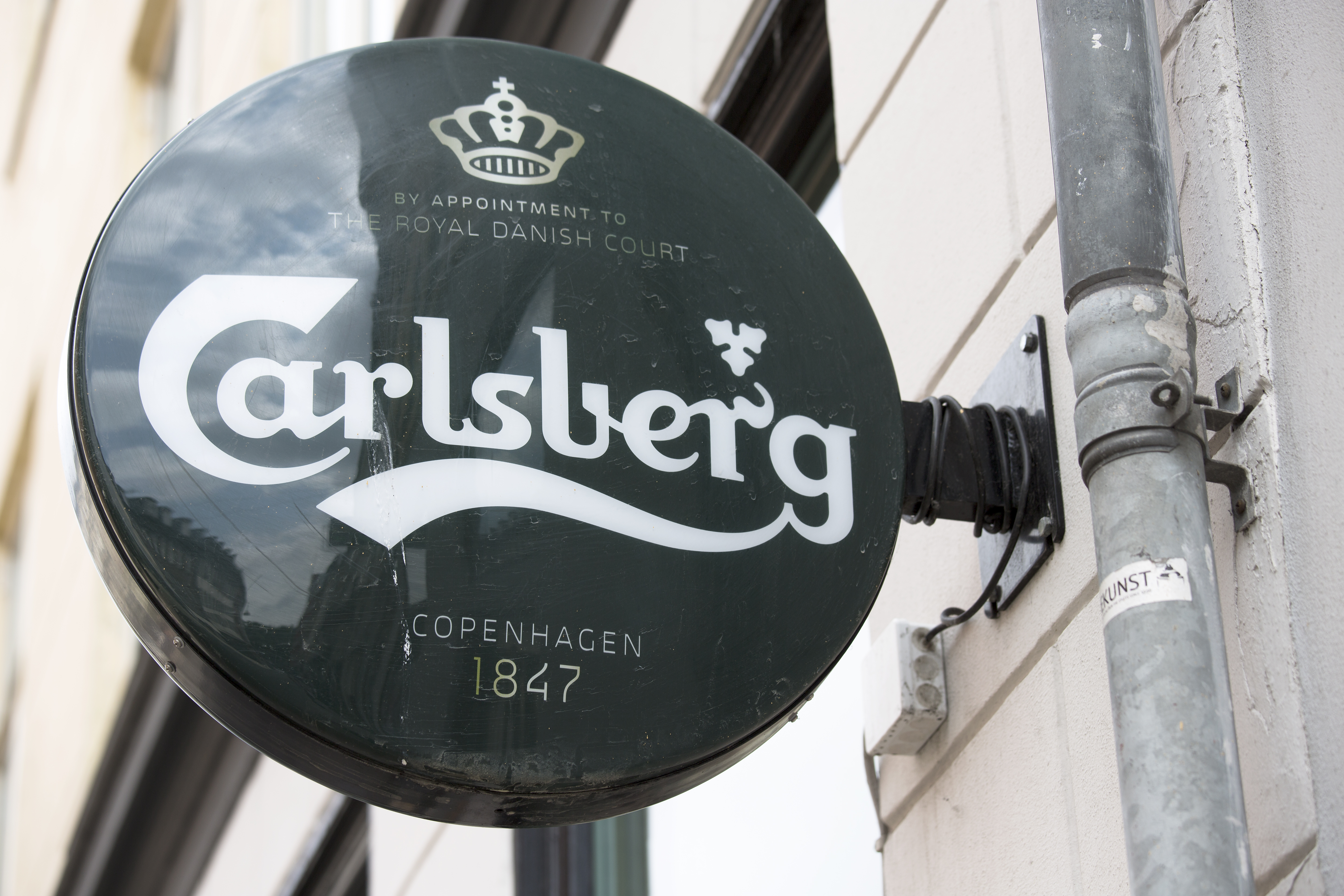

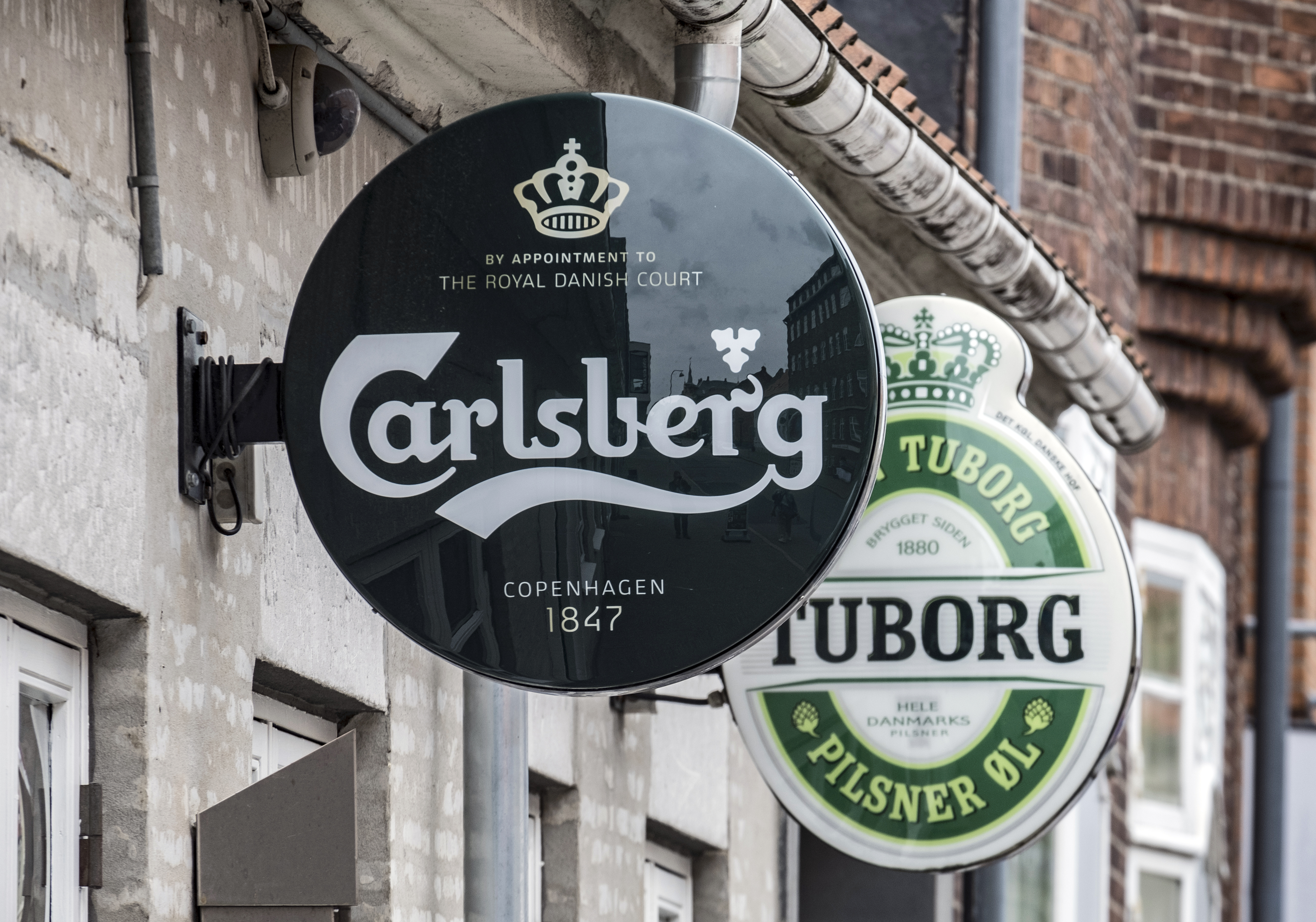

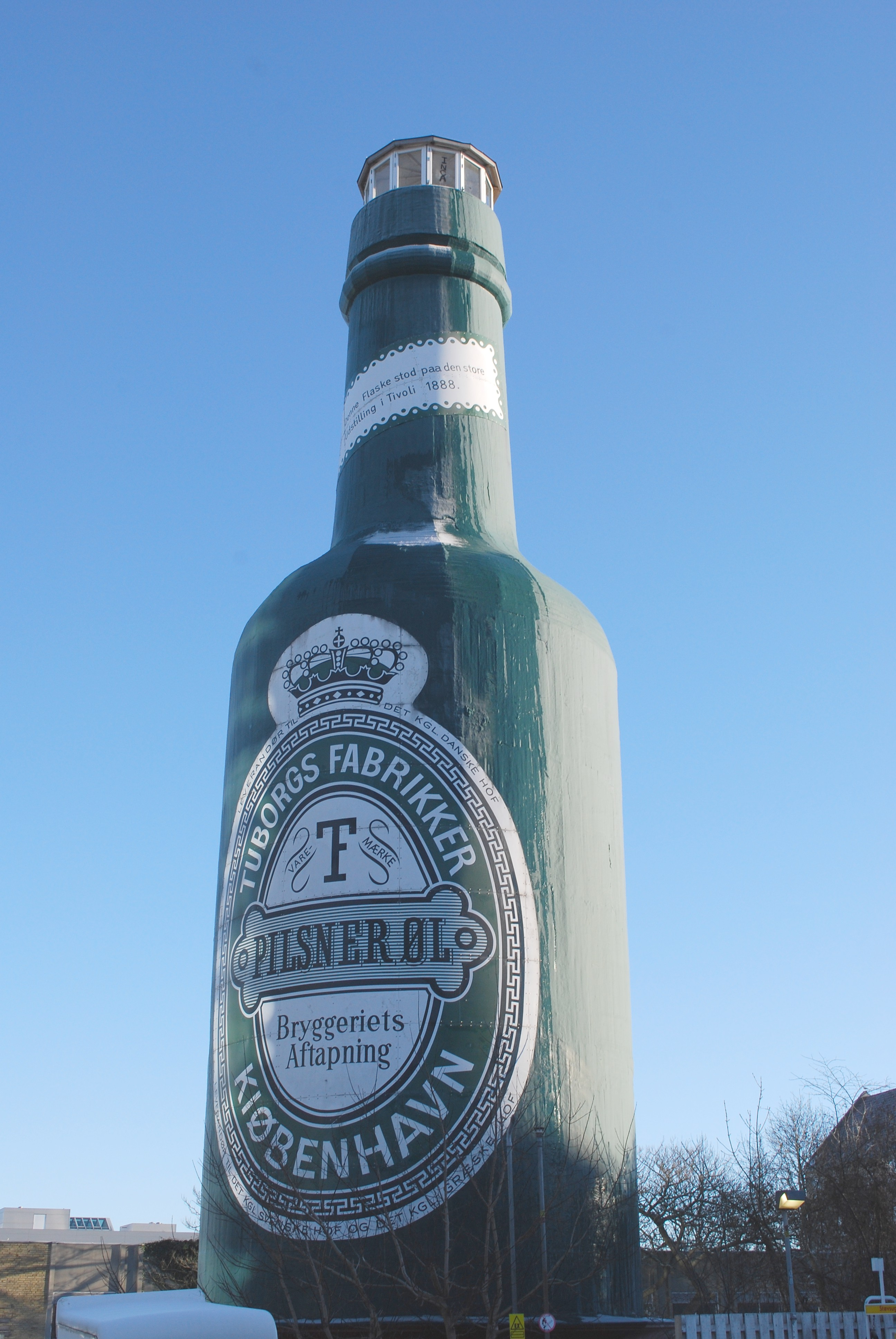
The Tuborg Bottle in Hellerup

Carlsberg's tagline "Probably the best lager in the world" was created in 1973 by Tony Bodinetz at KMP for the UK market. It began to appear in company corporate ads around the world from the 1980s onwards until it was replaced in 2011 in most regions by new tagline "That calls for a Carlsberg". The voice over for the original ad in 1983 was voiced by actor Orson Welles, his voice has been used repeatedly over the years. Welles was not expensive and he liked the advertisements, so he kept his fees to a minimum. In some countries the tagline has been adapted to "Probably the best beer in the world".

Carlsberg has been criticised for breaking their own code of conduct for alcohol advertisement in Malawi.

In 2011, "That calls for a Carlsberg" was introduced as the new Carlsberg tagline and has appeared in various television adverts since. The new-look marketing campaign was rolled out across 140 markets and included a new 30-second TV ad called 'Spaceman'. The company wants to boost sales in Asia and the Far East, but there were fears that 'probably' was too subtle as a tagline.

=== Sponsorships ===
Sponsorships from Carlsberg comes in two forms, sharply separated: either from the Carlsberg Brewery as part of their commercial campaigns, or as significant contributions to arts and sciences via the Carlsberg Foundation (who owns the brewery).

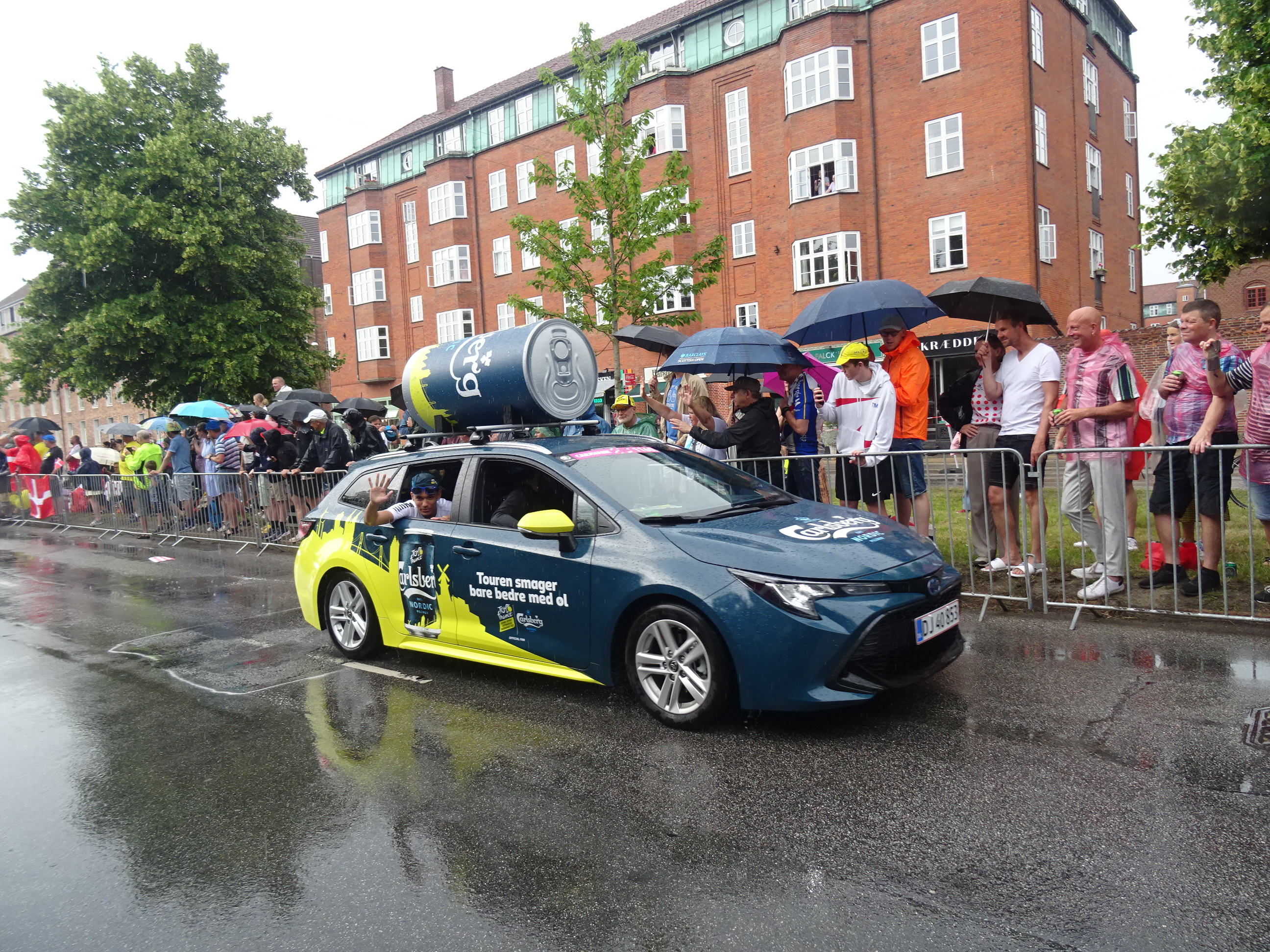
Promotional Caravan of the Tour de France in Copenhagen

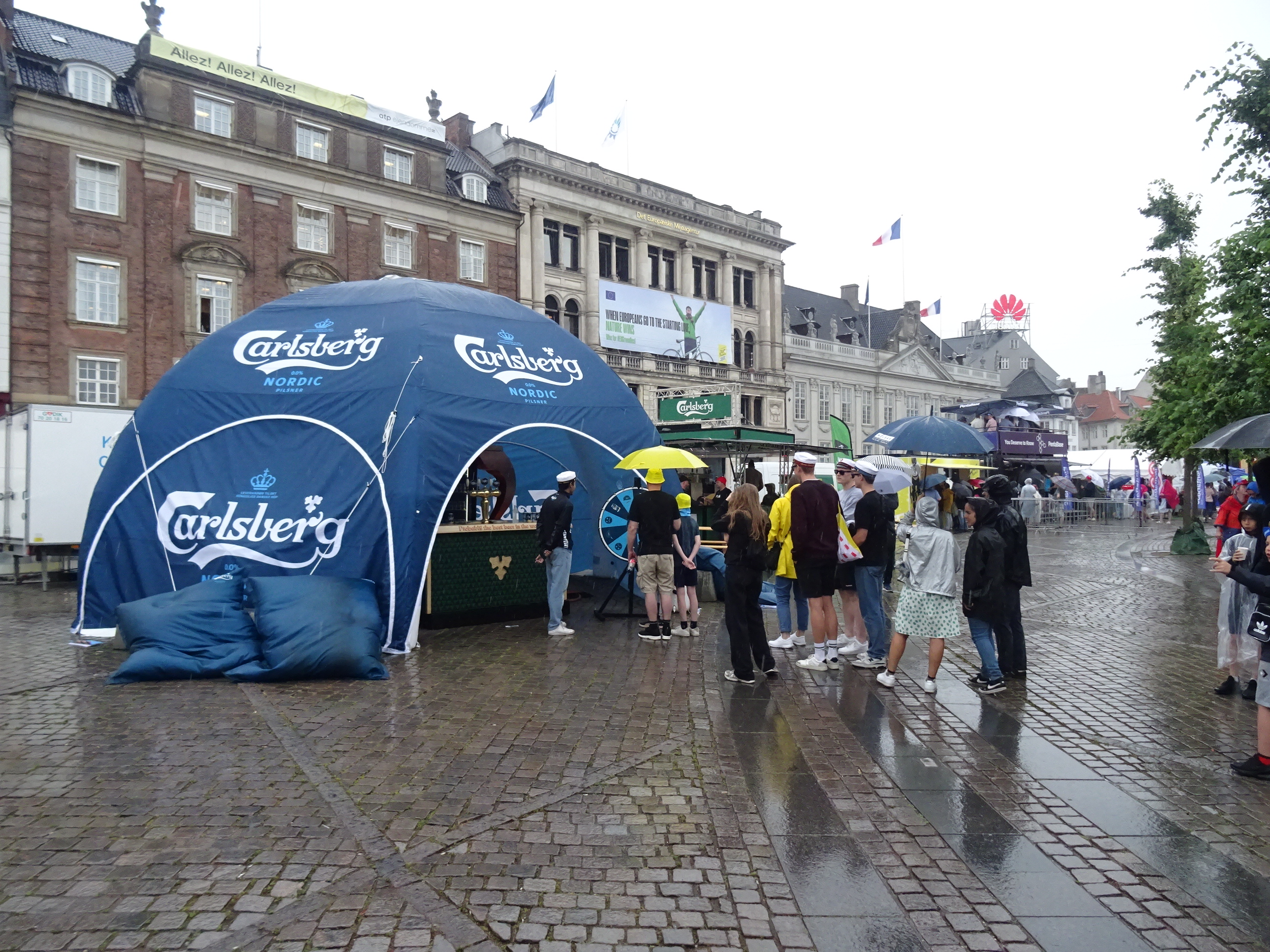
Tour de France Fan Park in Copenhagen

Carlsberg Brewery was one of the major sponsors of Euro 2008, Euro 2012 and also UEFA Euro 2016 (where their adboards were changed to read their abridged tagline, "Probably", due to France's laws against alcohol advertising). Carlsberg was one of the major sponsors of the 2004 European Football Championship and use the promotional slogan "probably the best lager in the world"; they were also a sponsor of the 1990 FIFA World Cup. Carlsberg are best known in the UK as the main and shirt sponsors of Liverpool F.C. having sponsored the club from 1992 continuing through to 2016. With Liverpool being the only UK city exhibiting at the World Expo in Shanghai – its twin city, the Carlsberg logo on the Liverpool F.C jersey was written in Chinese for the league match against Chelsea F.C on 2 May 2010.

Carlsberg also sponsor F.C. Copenhagen, Havant and Waterlooville, Odense Boldklub, Pirin Blagoevgrad and are also the secondary sponsor (after Eircom) of the Republic of Ireland national football team and Tottenham Hotspur F.C. Carlsberg also sponsors other sport events, such as golf and skiing. On 13 July 2011 Carlsberg signed a sponsorship contract with Hajduk Split and contributed 40,000 Euros to the team to help avert a financial crisis in 2013.

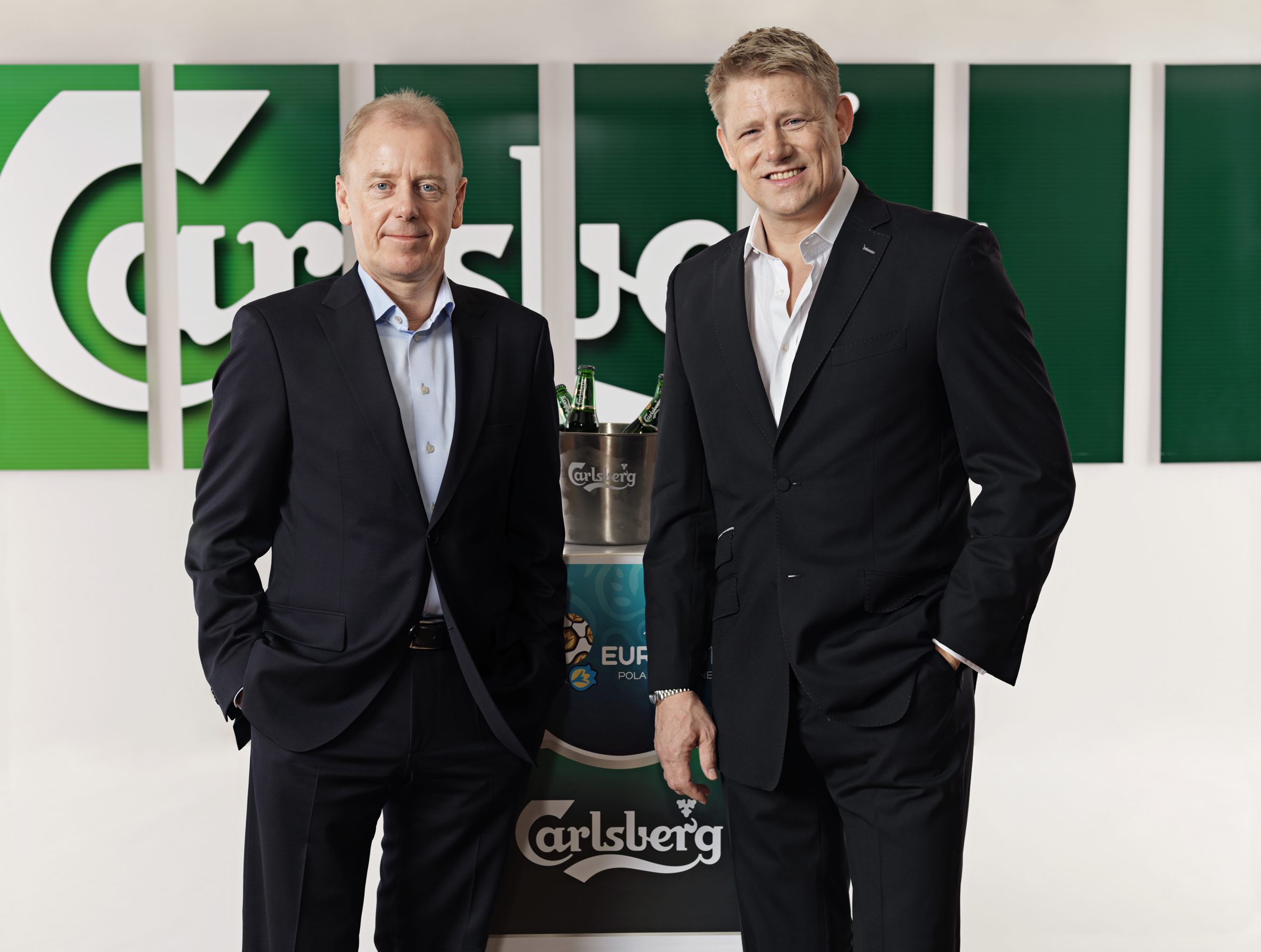
Former Carlsberg CEO Jørgen Buhl Rasmussen (left) and brand ambassador Peter Schmeichel (right)

As of August 2011, Carlsberg also became Arsenal F.C's official beer sponsor for three years. Carlsberg has also sponsored the Hong Kong Rugby Sevens in 2015.

Goalkeeper Peter Schmeichel became the first ever worldwide ambassador for Carlsberg. He was announced as the face of Carlsberg's UEFA Euro 2016 sponsorship campaign.

On 20 March 2025, Carlsberg announced its return as the Official Beer of UEFA National Team Football. The agreement covers UEFA EURO 2028, UEFA Women’s EURO 2029, Nations League competitions, European qualifiers and UEFA Futsal EURO tournaments. Its previous UEFA partnership ran from 1988 to 2016.

The Institute of Theoretical Physics (also known as the "Niels Bohr Institute") in Copenhagen, which was one of the leading international centers for theoretical physics during the 1920s and 1930s and is said to be the birthplace of quantum mechanics, was created in 1921 with significant funding from the Carlsberg Foundation. Other projects funded by the Carlsberg Foundation include: Dating the Greenland Ice Core, Uncovering the Iron-Age in Northern Europe, Discovering the Secrets of Molecular Diversity, and Creating Dictionaries on the Web.

== Controversies ==
=== China ===
According to reporting by Danish investigative media Danwatch, Carlsberg has participated in government oppression of Uyghurs by operating breweries, producing Wusu Beer, and holding the Wusu Beer Festival in Xinjiang while the government sanctions Muslims for abstaining from alcohol.

=== Nepal ===
A factory in Nepal owned by Carlsberg has been shown to severely pollute a nearby river. Initially, Carlsberg denied the pollution; in 2018, the company admitted to the wrongdoing.

=== Russia ===
In March 2022, Carlsberg issued a press release stating they would leave the Russian market following the continued invasion of Ukraine by Russia as part of the Russo-Ukrainian War. By the following March, Carlsberg had not left and was exploring the possibility of a buyback clause but in June 2023 the company announced that a deal to sell the Russia business had been reached. In July 2023 Russia seized the shares in the Carlsberg-owned Baltika Breweries and placed it under the control of the Russian Federal Agency for State Property Management.

The new CEO of the Carlsberg Group, Jacob Aarup-Andersen, said in the fall of 2023 that Russia had stolen their business and that the group would not enter into negotiations with the Russian authorities.

== See also ==
- Beer in Denmark
