= Ciney (beer) =

Belgian beer

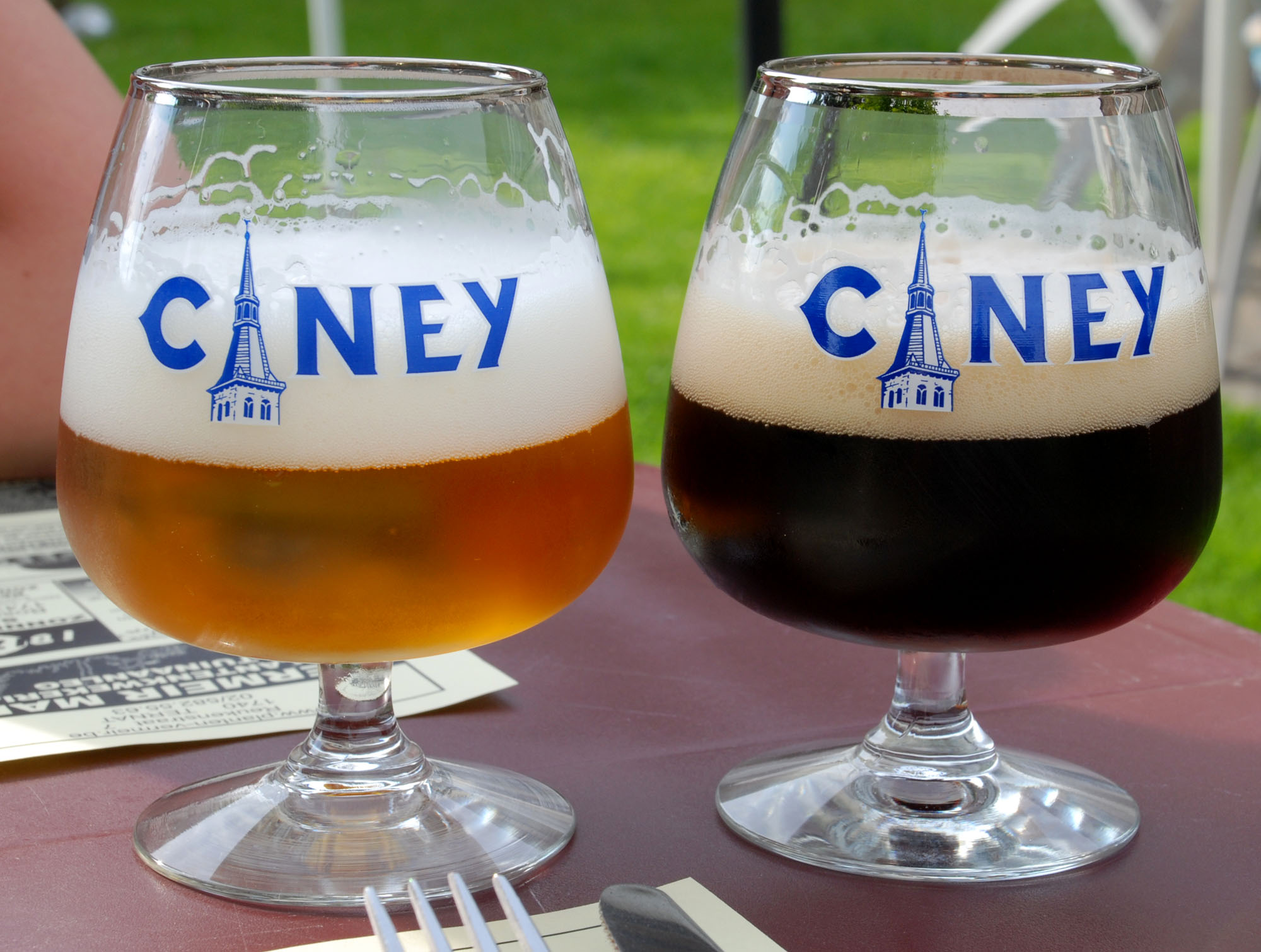
Two Ciney beers: a blonde (left) and brown (right)

The Ciney is a Belgian beer native to town of Ciney.

In 2000, the Alken-Maes brewery bought the trademark rights to Ciney. A few months later, the brewery was acquired by the English group Scottish & Newcastle. From 2000 until 2007, Ciney was brewed in an Alken-Maes brewery in Jumet, (the Jumet brewery also produced Grimbergen, Hapkin, Judas, Scotch Watneys, and Red Barrel beers). After that, Ciney has been brewed at the Alken-Maes brewery in Alken.
