= Waarloos =

- Village
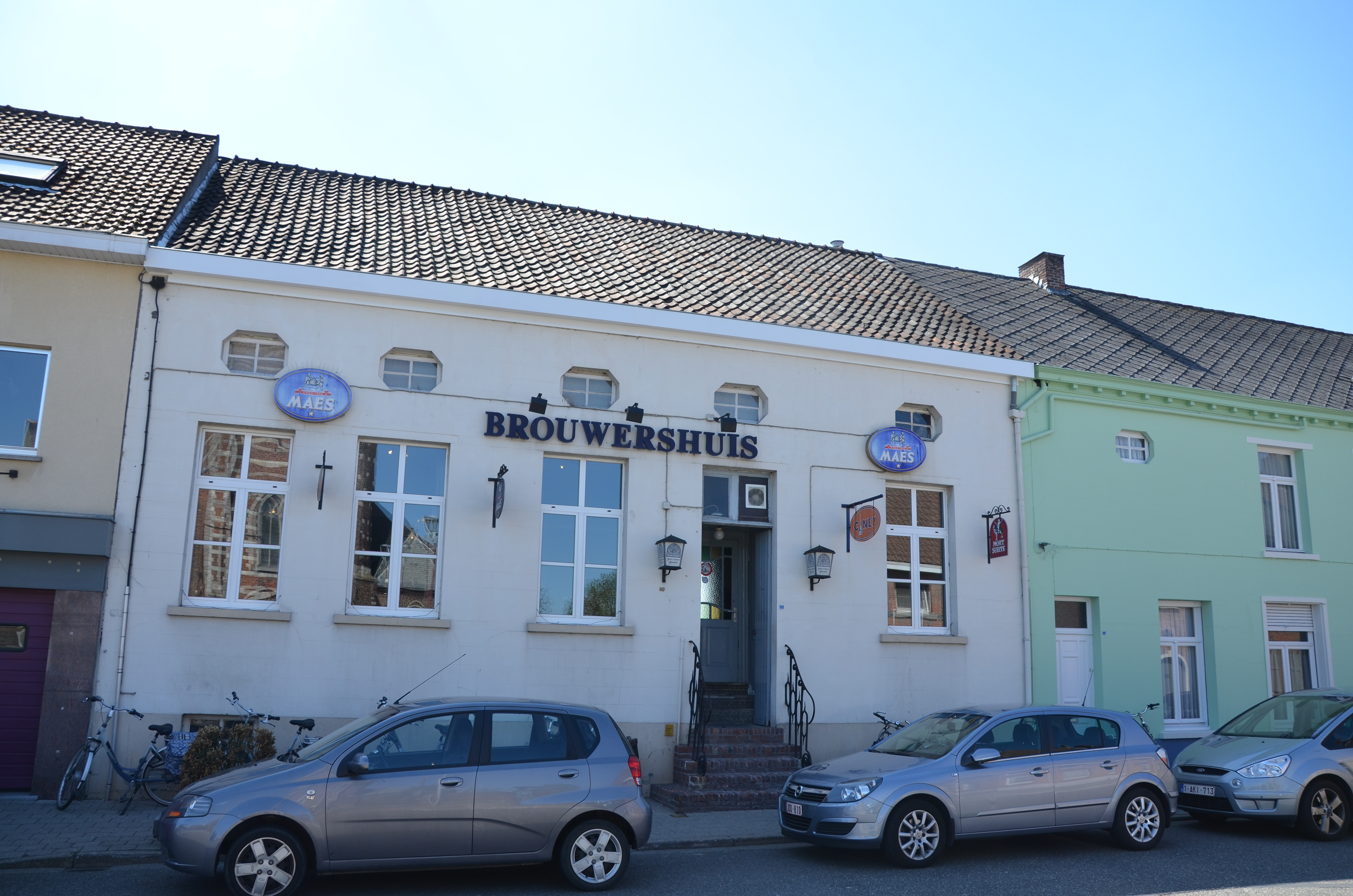
- Pub in Waarloos

- Location in Belgium
- Coordinates: 51.1038°N 4.4494°E
- Country: Belgium
- Region: Flemish Region
- Province: Antwerp
- Municipality: Kontich

Area
  - Total: 4.72 km^{2} (1.82 sq mi)

Population (2021)
  - Total: 1,860
  - Density: 394/km^{2} (1,020/sq mi)
- Time zone: CET

Waarloos is a village and deelgemeente (sub-municipality) of the municipality of Kontich in the province of Antwerp, Belgium. The village is located about 13 kilometres (8.1 mi) south of the city of Antwerp.

== History ==
Waarloos was first mentioned in 1188 when the church became part of Lobbes Abbey. The heerlijkheid (landed estate) belonged to the Lordship of Mechelen. The village was mainly an agricultural community.

In 1880, Maes Brewery was established in Waarloos by Egied Maes. Their main product was Maes pils which became one of the best selling beers in Belgium. From 1970 onwards, production of other beers stopped and Maes pils was their only product. In 1988, the brewery merged into Alken-Maes. In 2003, the brewery in Waarloos closed and production was transferred to Alken. In 2008, Maes became a brand of Heineken.

In 1907, a railway station opened on the Mechelen to Antwerp-South railway line. The line closed in 1968. Waarloos used to an independent municipality. In 1977, it was merged into Kontich.

== Buildings and sights ==
The St Michiel Church is a three aisled church in Gothic Revival style. The first church at the location has been known to exist in 1149. The current church dates from 1855, when the 16th century church was demolished except for the tower. The church was severely damaged during World War I and restored between 1922 and 1923. It was again damaged during World War II and restored between 1945 and 1947 and in 1951.

== Notable people ==
- John Doms (1924–2013), long-distance runner

== Gallery ==
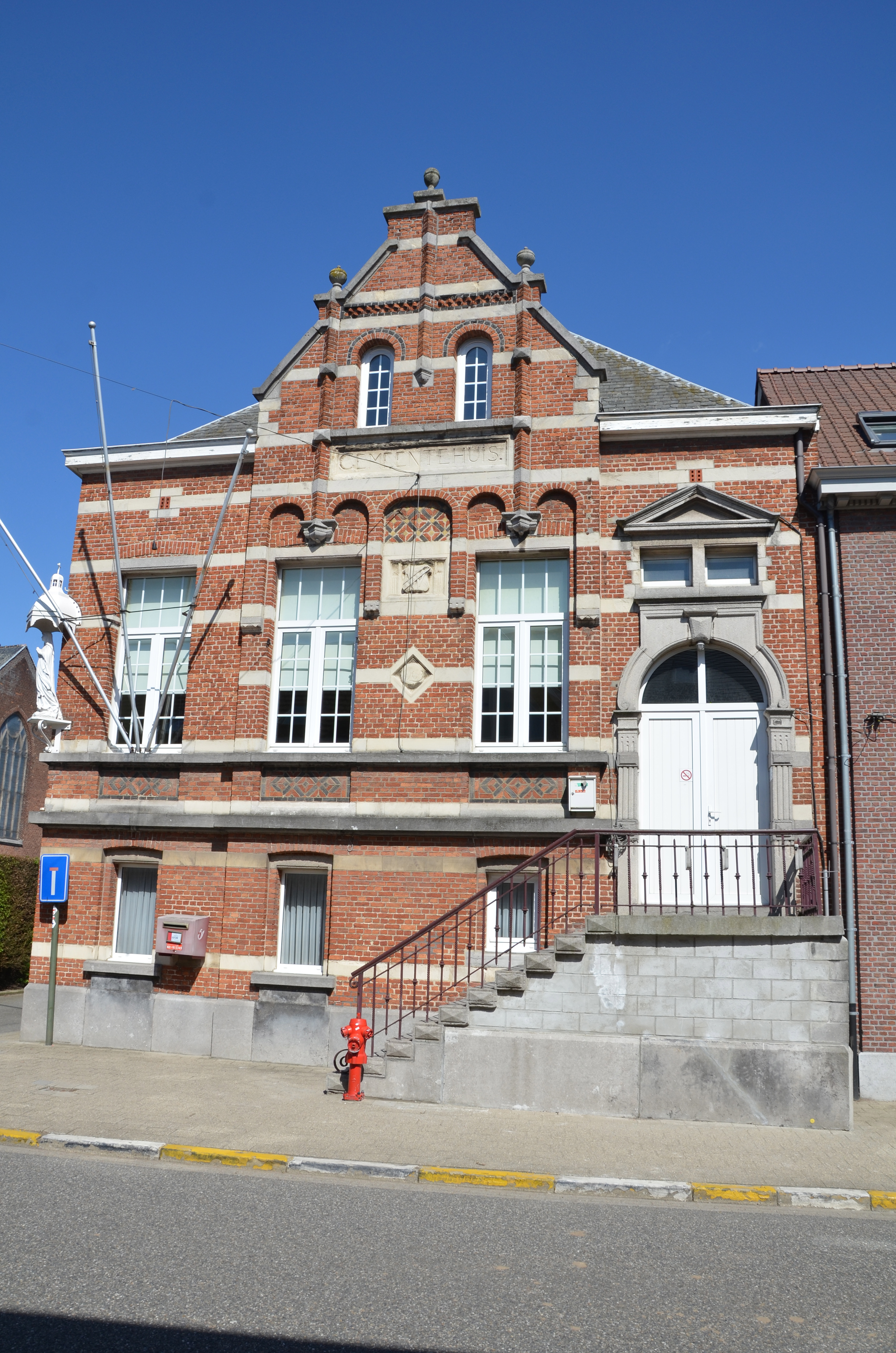
Town hall of Waarloos

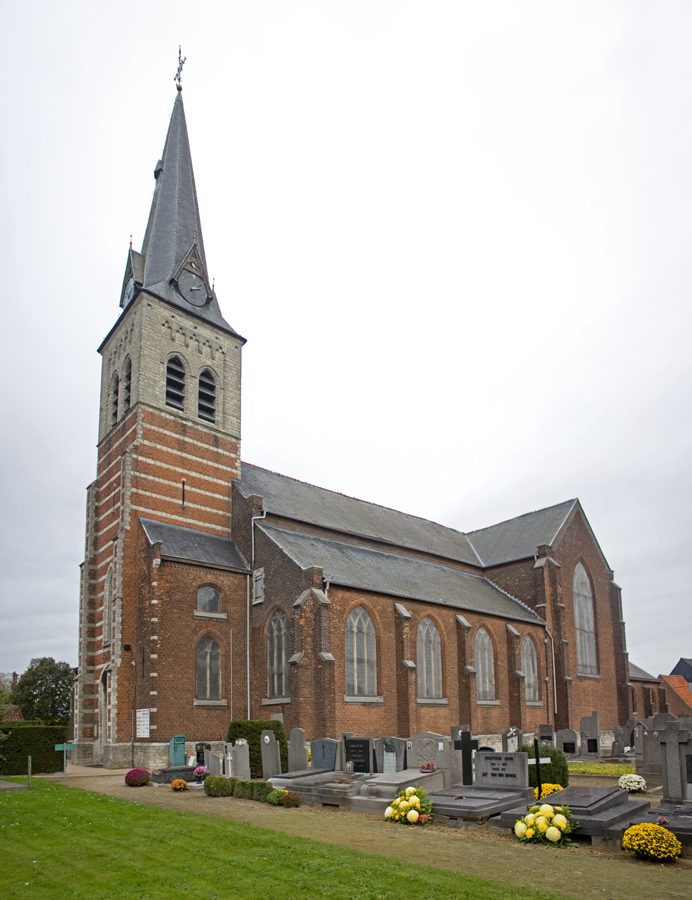
St Michiel Church
