= Robert Arcq =

Belgian writer (1925–1994)

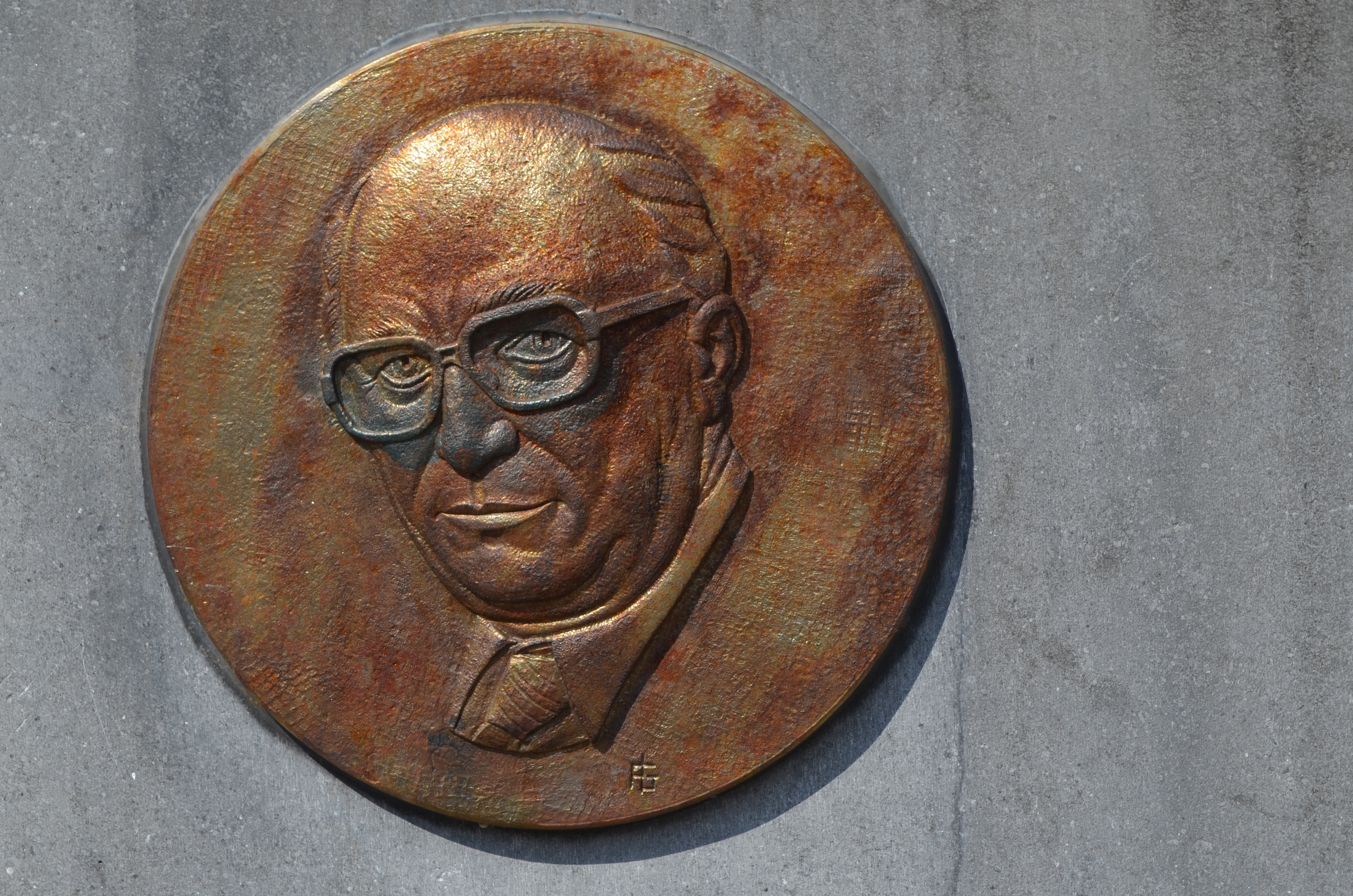
- Born: Robert Arcq; 20 January 1925; Belgium
- Died: 1994 (aged 68–69)
- Era: 20th-century writer

Robert Arcq (1925–1994) was a Belgian writer, working mainly in the Walloon language. A native of the area around Jumet, he was active in the vicinity of Charleroi. I included in his output are a number of aphorisms and a book of memoirs, published in 1980.
