= Alken-Maes =

Belgian brewery

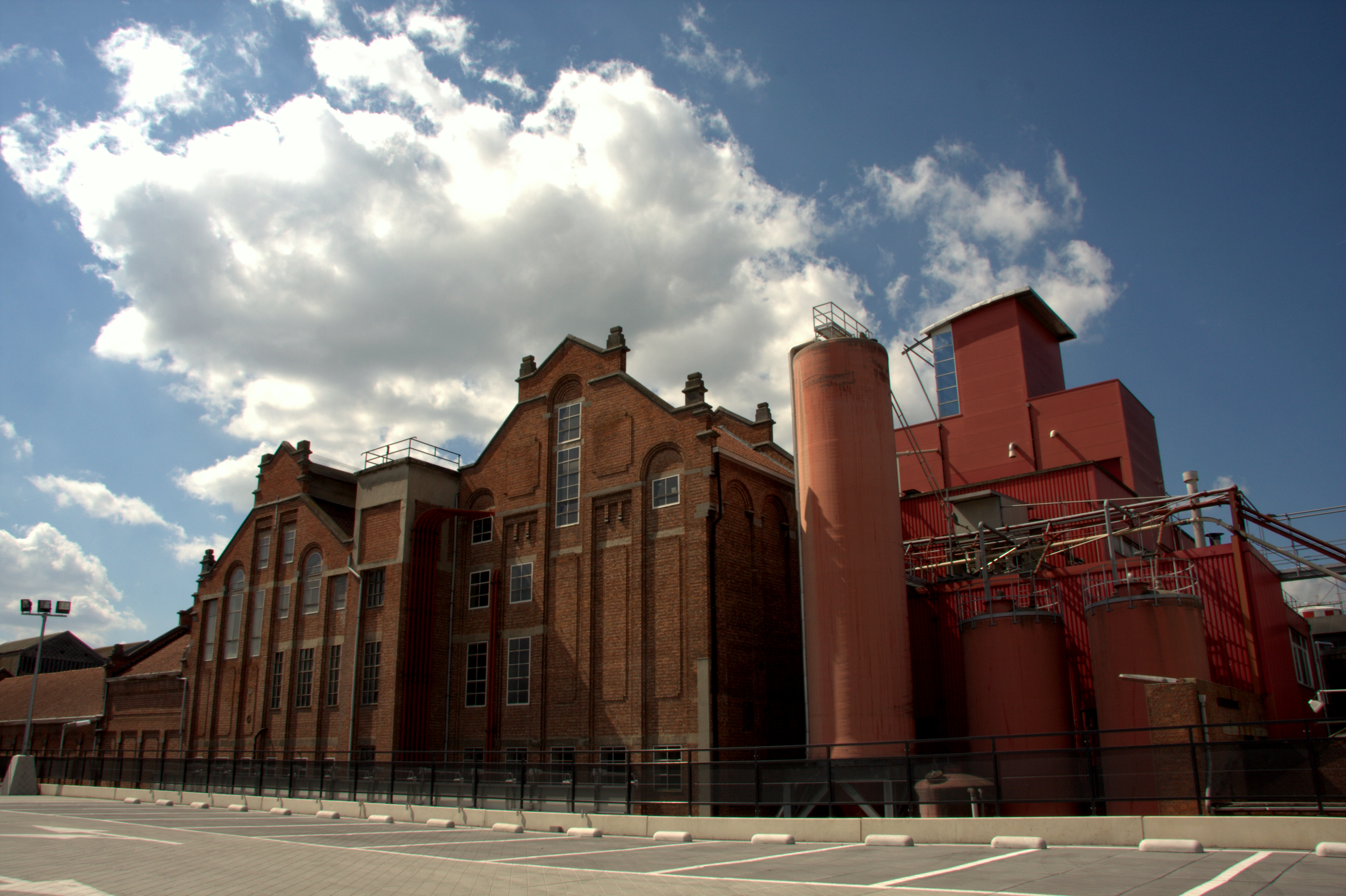
- Brouwerij Alken Maes
- Industry: Alcoholic beverage
- Predecessor: Maes Brewery; Cristal-Alken
- Founded: 1988
- Headquarters: Mechelen
- Products: Beer
- Owner: Heineken

Alken-Maes is a Belgian brewery created out of the 1988 merger of two small breweries, Maes located at Kontich-Waarloos and Cristal-Alken located at Alken. It was bought by Scottish & Newcastle in 2000, who were taken over by Scottish & Newcastle#Acquisition by Heineken in 2007.

== History ==
Alken-Maes was created out of the 1988 merger of two small breweries, Maes located at Kontich-Waarloos and Cristal-Alken located at Alken. Both had specialized in pils (Maes was producing Maes pils and Alken Cristal pils) until Maes purchased the Union brewery (based in Jumet) in 1978, which produced Grimbergen beer among others.

After the merger, the group continued to purchase other breweries to expand their offer to a larger panel of beers. In 1989, the new brewery purchased a 50% stake in De Keersmaeker brewery, which specialized in spontaneous fermentation beers such as Mort Subite. In 2000, it bought Ciney and Brugs Witbier, as well as the other 50% of De Keersmaeker.

In the same year, the brewery was bought by British company Scottish & Newcastle, which in turn was bought by the Carlsberg/Heineken consortium in 2007. In 2002, it took over the Louwaege brewery from Kortemark (producing Louwaeges Kriek and high fermentation Hapkin). Alken-Maes has now become the number two on the Belgian market. Its headquarters are in Waarloos.

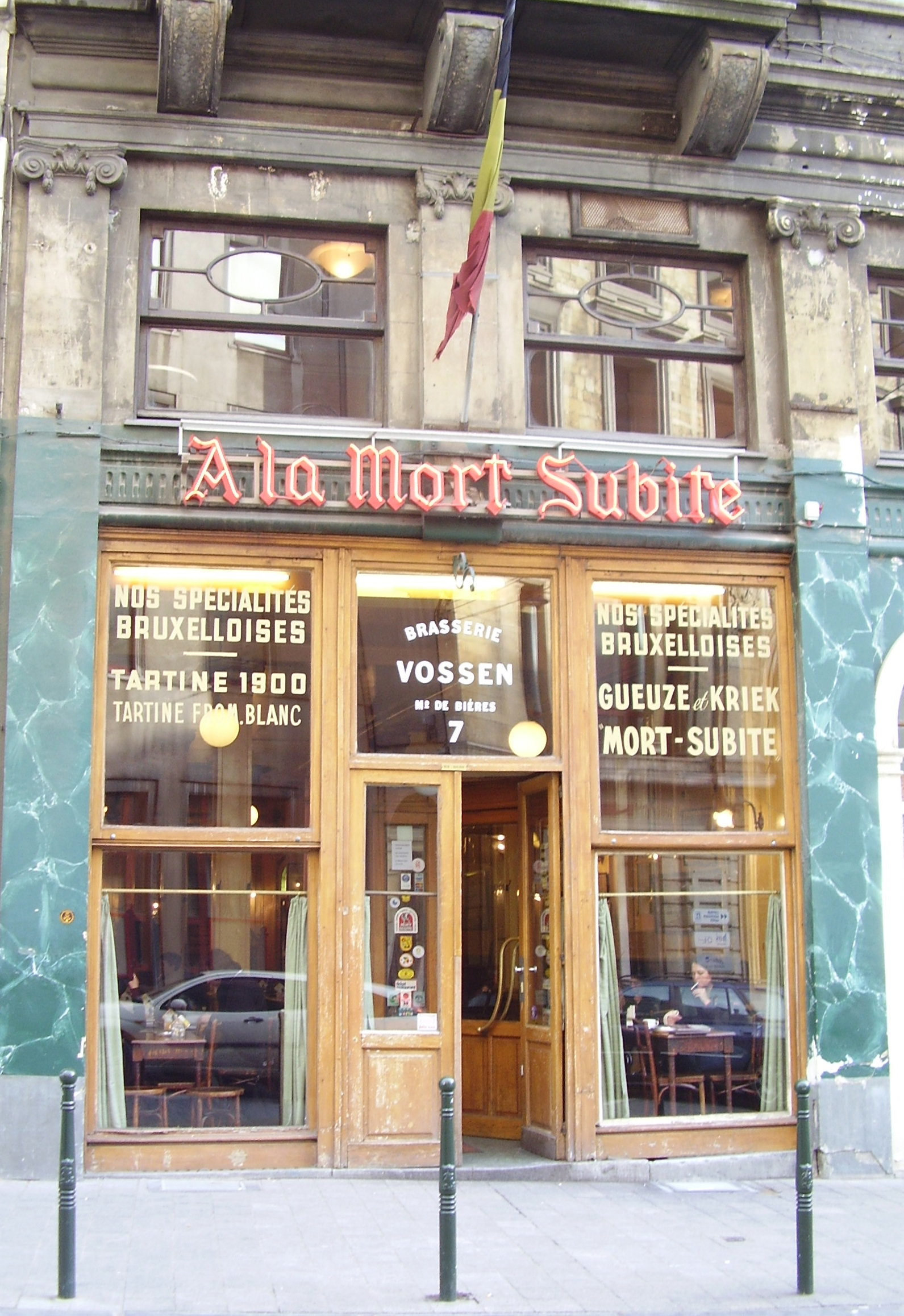
À la Mort Subite, the Brussels café giving its name to a line of Alken-Maes beer

== Products ==
- Pils: Maes pils, Cristal, Kronenbourg 1664, Foster's, and Cara Pils (formerly)
- Brown beers: Zulte, Judas, Brown Ciney and Special Ciney
- Blond beers: Blond Ciney, Hapkin
- Abbey beers: Affligem, Grimbergen (blond, Trippel, Optimo Bruno, Dubbel and Cuvée de l'Ermitage)
- Wheat beer: Brugs
- Spontaneous fermentation (lambic) beers: Mort Subite (gueuze and fruit lambics, including cherry (kriek) and raspberry (framboise/frambozen)), Louwaeges Kriek
- Beers with a low alcoholic content: Maes Nature and Tourtel (alcohol-free).

=== Mort Subite ===
Mort Subite Lambic Beer

Mort Subite is the brand name for a number of lambic beers brewed by the Belgian brewery Keersmaeker. The beers take their name from a café in Brussels, À La Mort Subite. Mort subite means "sudden death" in French, but can also be used to refer to the final throw in a dice game. Underground trading once took place within À La Mort Subite – it was named after the speed at which one could lose one's money.

It is explained that the name was derived from the bar's proximity to the law court. In effect, lawyers and clerks would play cards during their lunch break and when the bell rang to resume proceedings, the hand held was subject to sudden death rules to ascertain the winner. This derivation is also listed in the Rough Guide series of books.
