= À la Mort Subite =

Historic café in Brussels, Belgium

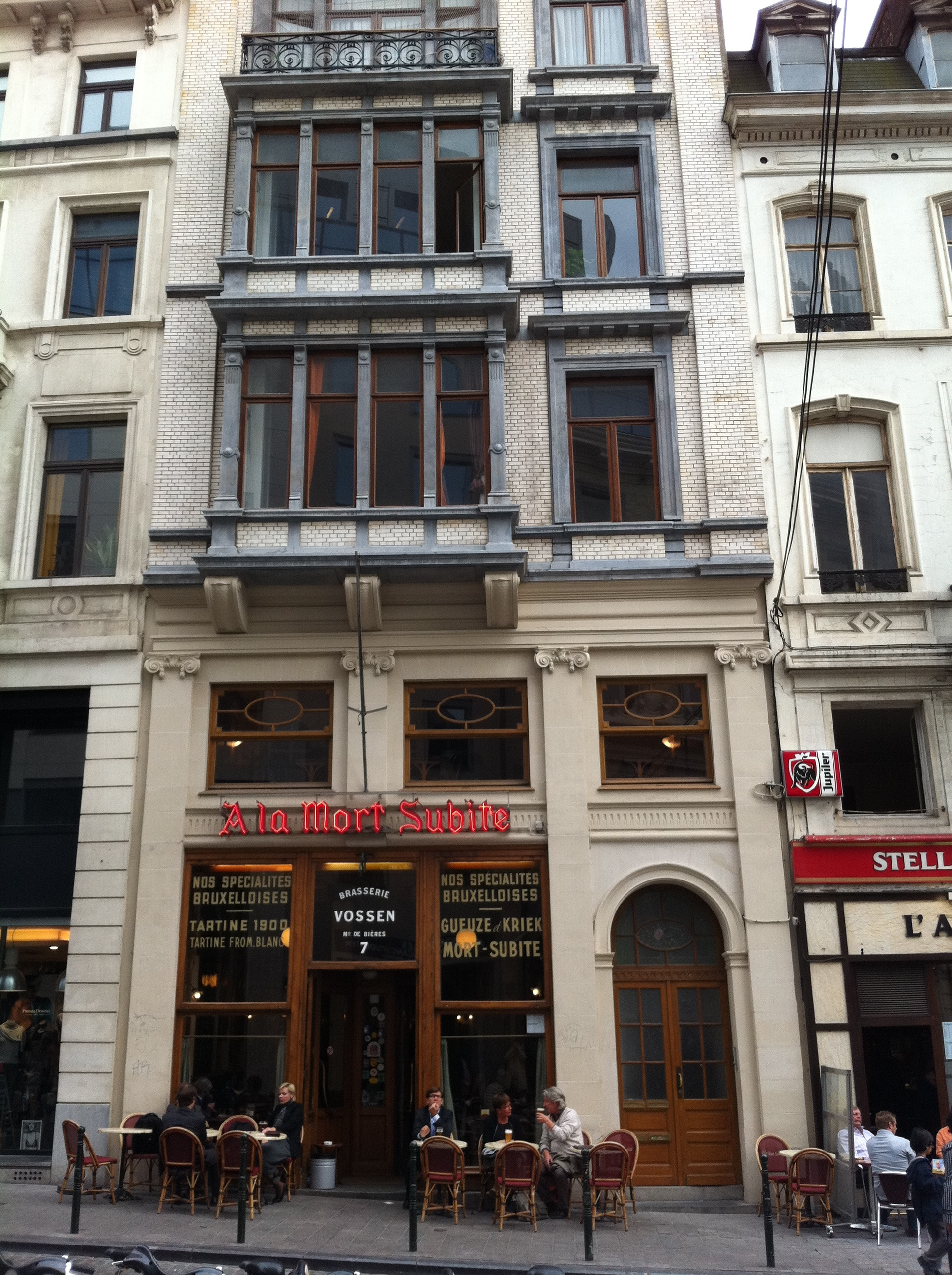
- Exterior of À la Mort Subite

General information
- Status: Listed building
- Type: Café
- Architectural style: Neo-Louis XVI
- Location: 5–7 Rue Montagne-aux-Herbes Potagères/Warmoesberg, 1000 City of Brussels, Brussels-Capital Region, Belgium
- Coordinates: 50°50′55″N 4°21′22″E
- Construction started: 1902
- Renovated: 1906; 1910

Design and construction
- Architect: Joseph François Piscador

Renovating team
- Architects: F. Kielbaey; Paul Hamesse; Fritz Seeldraaiers

Other information
- Public transit: Brussels-Central; 1 5 Gare Centrale/Centraal Station

Website
- Official website

À la Mort Subite (French, pronounced [a la mɔɾ sybitə], lit. 'At the Sudden Death') is a historic café located at Rue Montagne-aux-Herbes Potagères/Warmoesberg 5–7 in Brussels, Belgium. It is noted for its early 20th-century interior and for serving Mort Subite beers, now produced by the Heineken subsidiary Alken-Maes. The café was designated a protected heritage site in 1998.

== History ==
The origins of the name trace back to the 1840s, when a bistro called La Cour Royale stood at the corner of Rue de la Montagne/Bergstraat and Rue d'Assaut/Stormstraat. Owned by a Mr Gérard, the establishment briefly hosted the Société des Droits et Devoirs de l'Ouvrier from 1848 to 1849, a group involved in the Prado Conspiracy in Molenbeek. Patrons played a dice and card game known as pitjesbak (ancestor of the 421 game), which included a sudden-death round called mort subite (“sudden death”).

At the beginning of the 20th century, La Cour Royale was taken over by Théophile Vossen, who renamed it La Mort Subite. Following expropriation due to works at the junction, the café relocated in 1927 to its current premises on Rue Montagne-aux-Herbes Potagères, officially adopting the name À la Mort Subite in 1928. Vossen started producing beers, including gueuze, faro, and kriek, at the brewery on Rue des Capucins/Kapucijnenstraat. Théophile’s grandchildren, René and Jean-Pierre Vossen, later continued the family business.

The Mort Subite beers, which are still served at the café, have a complex history. According to Van den Steen, the Mort Subite name appeared in 1970, when the café and geuze blending business was taken over from the Vossen brothers. Eventually, De Keersmaeker acquired the Mort Subite beer name, and their popular Geuze Den Hert became Geuze Mort Subite. Since 2007, the brand has been under the Carlsberg and Heineken groups.

The café itself has remained in the Vossen family and is now operated by the fourth generation, Théophile’s great-grandchildren Bernard and Olivier Vossen. In 2001, the first floor was refurbished and opened to customers. The café continues to serve Mort Subite lambics alongside other Belgian beers.

== Architecture ==
=== Exterior ===
The building is a rental property with four storeys plus an entresol and two uneven bays, originally designed by architect Joseph François Piscador in 1902, with an added mansard roof in 1906 by architect F. Kielbaey. The listed façade is constructed of brick and stone and articulated with pilasters. The wide left bay features a rectangular two-storey oriel topped with an iron balcony, while other windows have rectangular frames with string courses, entablatures, and continuous sills. A cornice rests on corner consoles. Originally, the ground floor housed a tall shopfront with glazed ironwork and an interior gallery, which was later converted into a café-restaurant by architects Paul Hamesse and Fritz Seeldraaiers in 1910, featuring three arched openings and rectangular entresol windows framed by Ionic pilasters.

The building is a rental property with four storeys plus an entresol and two uneven bays, designed by architect Joseph François Piscador in 1902. A mansard roof with slate covering was added in 1906 by architect F. Kielbaey. The listed façade is constructed of brick and stone, articulated with pilasters. The wide left bay features a two-storey rectangular oriel topped with an iron balcony. Other windows have rectangular frames with string courses, entablatures, and continuous sills. The cornice rests on corner consoles. The original ground-floor shopfront included glazed ironwork.

The café-restaurant conversion was carried out by architects Paul Hamesse and Fritz Seeldraaiers in 1910, featuring three arched openings and rectangular entresol windows framed by Ionic pilasters.

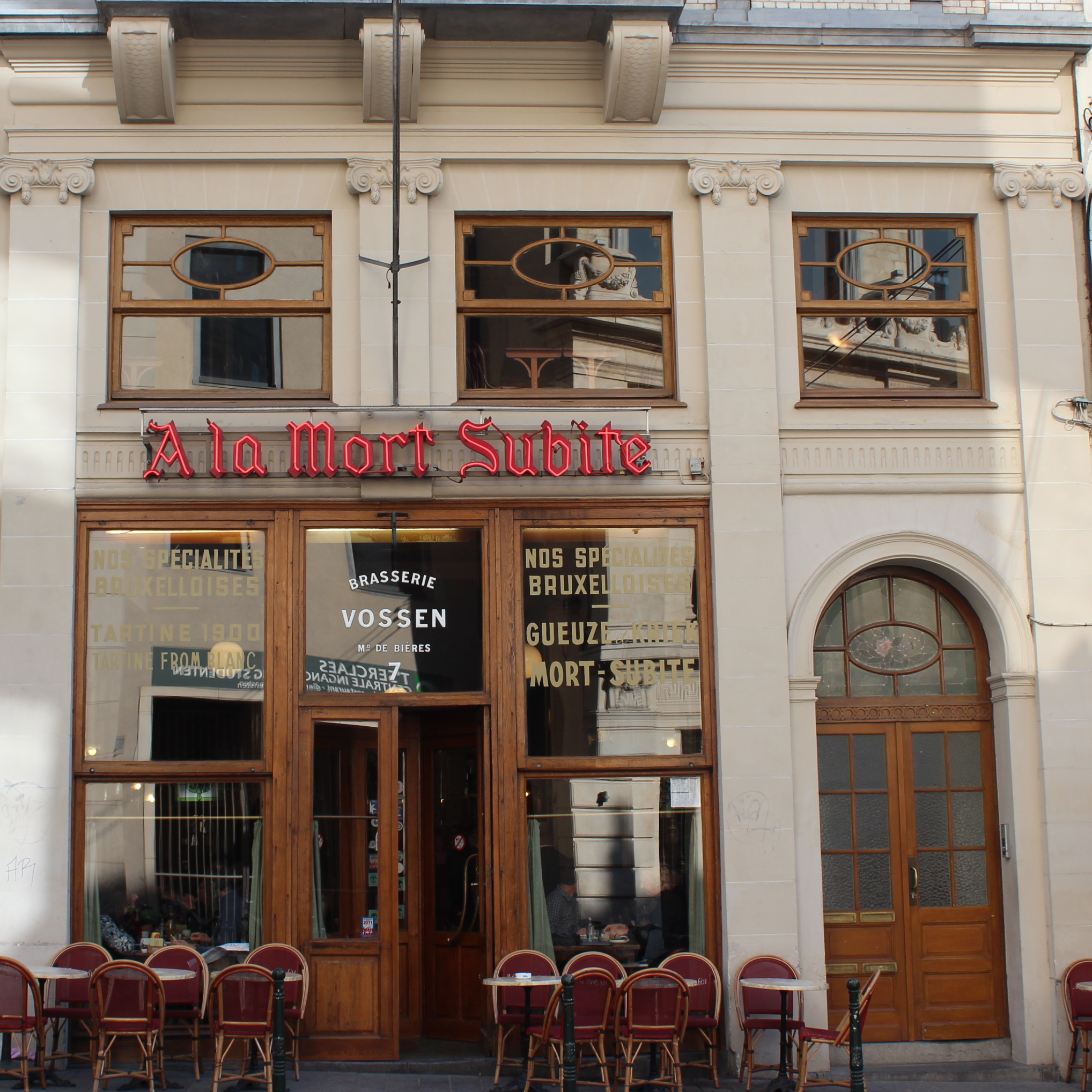
Entrance

=== Interior ===
The interior is designed in neo-Louis XVI style, with a three-aisled layout, wood paneling with pilasters, garlands, and mirrors, as well as remnants of an orchestra balcony.

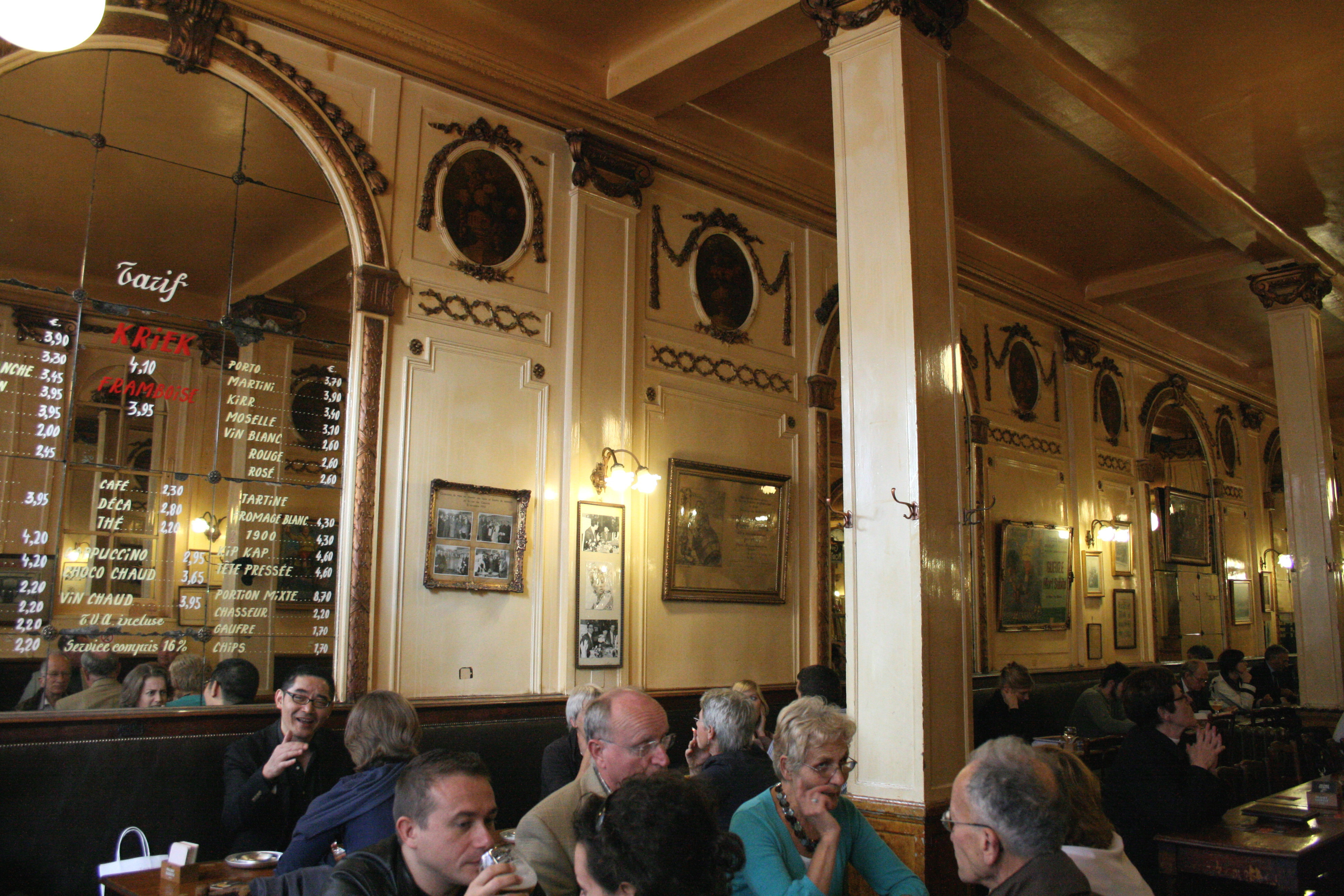
Interior

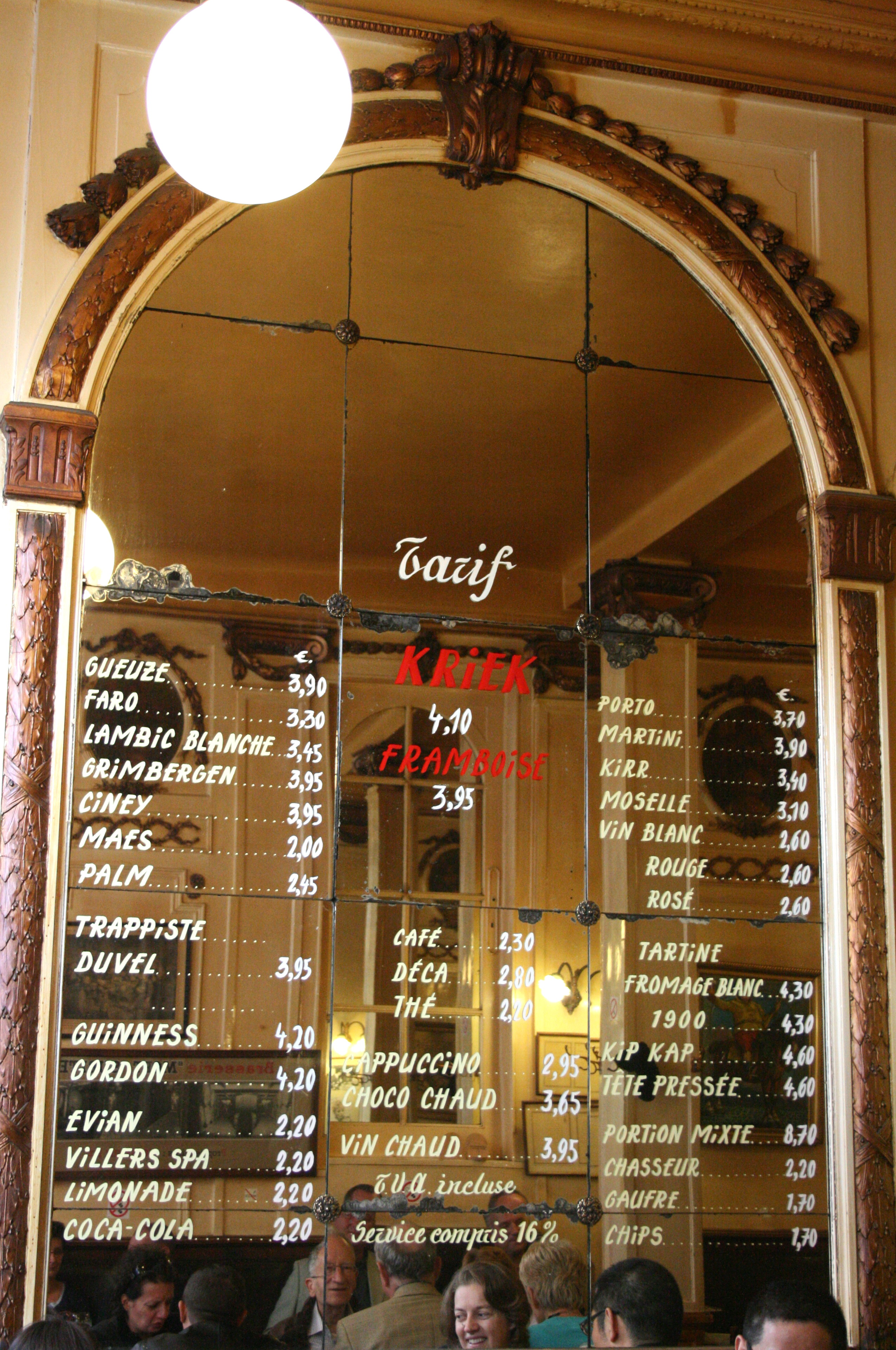
Mirror

== See also ==
- History of Brussels
- Culture of Belgium
- Belgium in the long nineteenth century
