= Grimbergen (disambiguation) =

Grimbergen may refer to:

== Places ==
- Grimbergen, Flemish Brabant, Belgium
  - Grimbergen Abbey, Premonstratensian monastery
  - Grimbergen Airfield

== People ==
- Maarten van Grimbergen (born 1959), Dutch hockey player
- Petra Grimbergen (born 1970), Dutch cyclist

== Other ==
- Grimbergen (beer), Belgian beer
