= Church of Saint-Sulpice, Jumet =

Church in Jumet, Belgium

Church of Saint-Sulpice
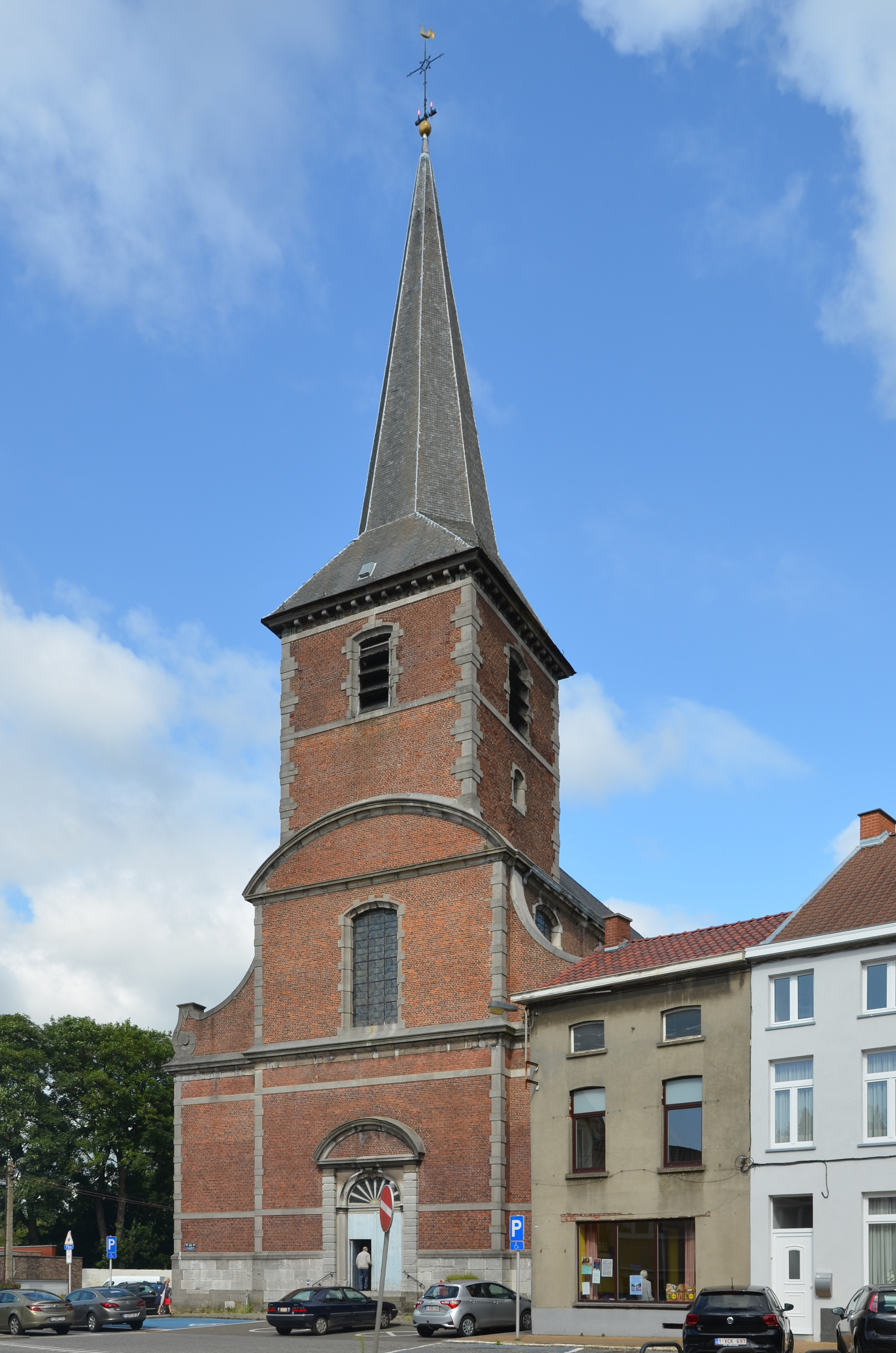

Religion
- Affiliation: Catholic
- District: Diocese of Tournai
- Province: Hainaut
- Ecclesiastical or organizational status: Church
- Status: Active

Location
- Location: Charleroi, Hainaut, Belgium
- Municipality: Charleroi
- Interactive map of Church of Saint-Sulpice
- Coordinates: 50.450875°N 4.425897°E

Architecture
- Groundbreaking: 1750
- Completed: 1753

The Church of Saint Sulpice (French: Église Saint-Sulpice; French pronunciation: [sɛ̃sylpis]) is a Catholic church in Jumet, a neighborhood of the Belgian city of Charleroi in Hainaut Province, Wallonia. It is dedicated to Sulpitius the Pious. The oldest material traces of a religious building on the site date back to the 10th century. Three churches built there before the current structure were identified during excavations carried out in 1967. The current classical building was built between 1750 and 1753 by an unknown architect. The brick and limestone church is uniform in appearance. It is composed of six bayed naves flanked by aisles, a three-sided transept, and a choir with a polygonal ambulatory with a sacristy in its axis. The chamfered base is in dimension stone on the frontage and in rubble stones and sandstone for the rest of the base. All of the building's angles are toothed and every second stone is bossed. The church has been listed as a Belgian cultural heritage site since 1949.

== Historical context ==
The location of the church in Jumet appears in the 868 CE polyptych of Lobbes Abbey. Additional records appear to have been destroyed during bombings of the State Archives in Mons and the episcopal archives of Tournai during World War II.

Prior to the French Revolution, Jumet was a part of the Prince-Bishopric of Liège. However its neighbouring states, Hainaut and Brabant, challenged Liège's claim to Jumet. Over time, Brabant gained in influence, seemingly with the support of the local population. By the 1730s, Brabant was acting as if it completely owned Jumet. During the 1740s, Duchess Maria Theresa of Austria and the Council of Brabant instituted administrative reforms at the request of the mayor and the magistrate. On 28 June 1780, Prince-Bishop François-Charles de Velbrück officially yielded the lordship of Jumet to Brabant. During the period of French rule, Jumet belonged to the department of Jemappes, which became part of the province of Hainaut after the fall of Napoleon.

The church's predecessors, whose patron saint remains unknown, belonged to a parish of the old deanery of Fleurus, part of the Diocese of Liège. In 1559, during reforms of the episcopal hierarchy of the Low Countries, this parish was first assigned to the newly created Diocese of Namur and later to the Diocese of Tournai in the Concordat of 1801.

== The excavation of 1967 ==
In 1967, the church underwent a major restoration led by Simon Brigode, architect and professor at the University of Leuven. Excavations were also carried out from 16 to 22 August 1967 by an assistant professor at the university, Luc-Francis Genicot. The excavations were done in a limited area which turned out to be of significance although the restoration work had already destroyed some of the ancient foundations.

August 1967 excavation layout

The construction of the current church had already profoundly modified the earlier site. The 18th-century flooring is lower than earlier levels; only the lowest levels of the old foundation still remained. During the excavations, workers found no foundation, no under-pavement, no lime mortar runoff, and no altar base. The sepulchre lay only 19 centimetres (7.5 in) under the current flooring level.

Work done in the 19th and 20th centuries removed ancient traces. A thin brick gutter to hold gas lighting pipes was installed during the second half of the 19th century, cutting across the B trench. An early 20th-century gutter, constructed roughly along the lengthwise axis of the current church, cut through the old foundations.

These surveys made it possible to correctly locate the building's successive stages of growth.

== The successive churches ==
Three religious buildings that preceded the current church were uncovered during the excavations.

Superimposed plans of churches 1, 3 and 4

=== First church ===
The first building was Pre-Romanesque and constituted a rectangular chamber composed of a plain nave 4.7 metres (5.1 yd) wide, whose length the excavations did not manage to determine. It is possible that, as in other small churches of the early Middle Ages, the length of the church was double its width. This edifice may have been the church consecrated between 959 and 971 by Eraclus, abbot of Lobbes and bishop of Liège, which was mentioned in the "Eraclus charter".

=== Second church ===
Superimposed plans of churches 2 and 3

During the excavation, the sole trace of the second church — the foundation of an irregular three-sided apse— was found. How the building was constructed toward the narthex remains unclear. However, it is known that this side ended with a tower because Jehan Camal, the local priest, bequeathed 50 livres towards the repairing of the tower and the installation of a bell in his will of 1517. This tower is probably the same one mentioned in the 17th century, which was demolished for the construction of the 18th century church. The size of the choir/chancel suggests a three-apsed construction, maybe similar to the third church. As well as the main altar, a Pouillé ecclesiastical register from 1445 mentioned an altar devoted to Saint Nicholas, and another from 1518 mentions an altar devoted to the Virgin Mary.

Noting the similarities to the choir in Saint-Martin's church at Marcinelle, rebuilt at the end of the 15th century, Luc-Francis Genicot hypothesised that it took inspiration from Jumet's earlier design, possibly from the 14th century.

In the choir lies a burial place containing a skeleton in a nailed oak coffin. The presence of embroidered cloth and the location suggests that it is the tomb of a priest, probably the local parson.

=== Third church ===
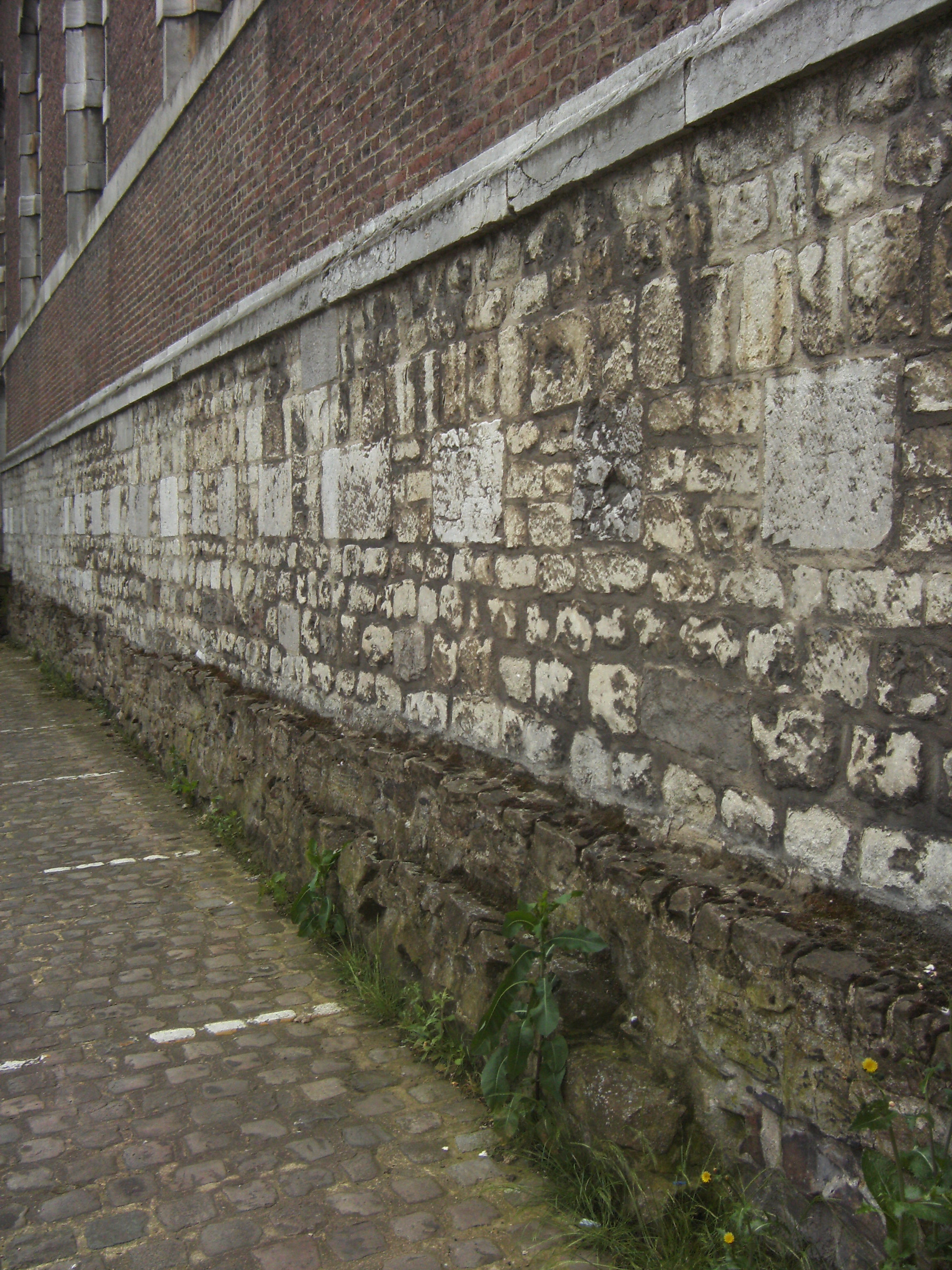
Foundations of previous buildings

The chancel of the third edifice probably dates back to the middle of the 17th century. This church is eight times bigger than the first. The chancel is of a pentagonal design 8.25 metres (9.02 yd) deep. It is consolidated by four buttresses, suggesting that it was once covered by a solid vault, probably of gothic design. The nave, 22 metres (24 yd) long and of an estimated width of 20 metres (22 yd), is slightly trapezium-shaped and has two aisles. The scale of the aisles is evocative of the hall church type, like many that existed in Hainault in the 15th and 16th century.

The bell tower, standing against the church frontage, underwent significant restoration in 1670 and had a clock installed in 1681. The tower was probably square and roughly 6.4 metres (7.0 yd) long on each side. It was capped by an octagonal pointed spire, topped by a big finial cross and a weathercock reaching 38 metres (42 yd) in height.

In 1710, the state of the church again called for serious repairs, and Jumet's bailiff, Jean de Vigneron, asked the Abbot of Lobbes, a big tithe collector, to build a new church. The abbey could not meet the expense. Finally, after a lawsuit, an agreement was reached for repairs to be made to the church, including the choir, tower and nave roof.

=== Present church ===
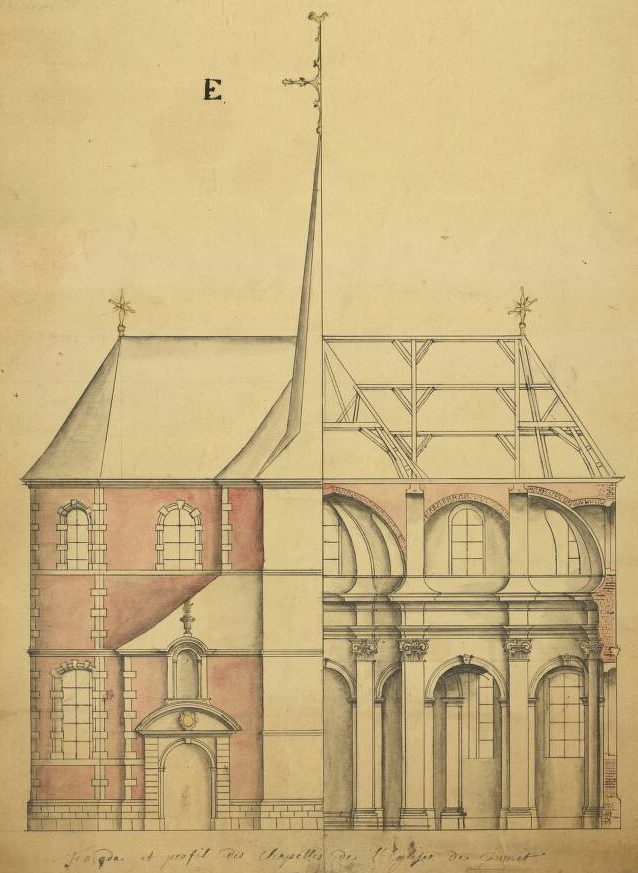
Section and elevation of the first draft of the 18th century with the old tower held (sheet E)

The current church was built between 1750 and 1753 by an unknown architect. The original plans consist of five coloured sheets. They have been numbered from A to E without any obvious order, probably after the completion of the construction. The C sheet did not belong to the first file, but the five drawings are from the same author. The E sheet has notes on the back on which the name D. De Lados appears twice, suggesting that it could be the name of the architect.

Before 1750, the old church was demolished and the ground leveled. The leveling probably explains why the present church isn't correctly oriented, unlike the original church, whose choir faced due east.

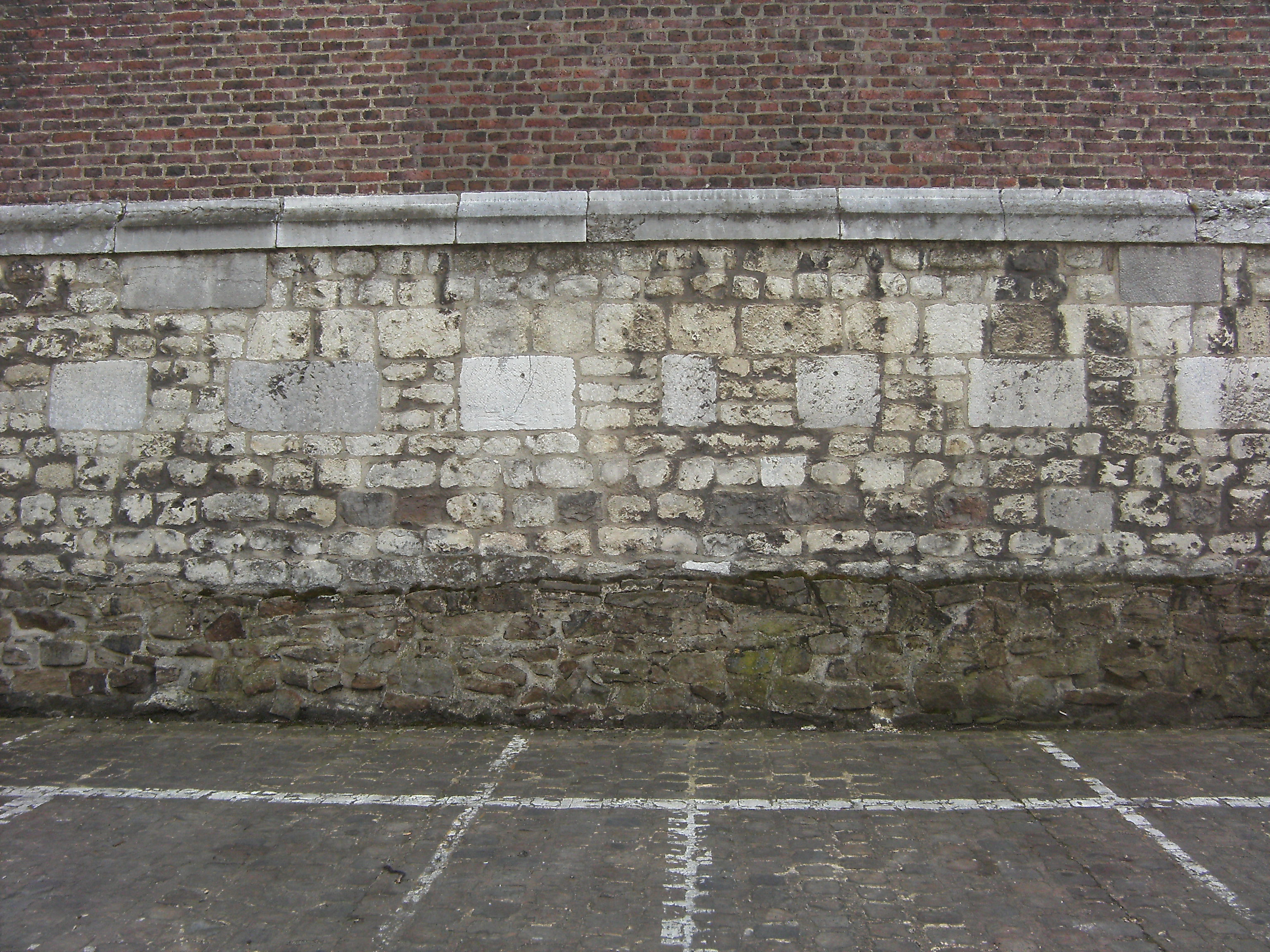
Details of materials reused in the current facing of the north facade

At the time, the design was considered ambitious and excessive for the town. Tensions existed between the architect and the sponsors, including the Abbot of Lobbes, Théodulphe Barnabé (abbot from 1728 to 1752). Construction lagged and, even though old materials were re-used in the base and the pavements, the cost was five times higher than the original estimate:

We have been greatly wronged for the erection of this church[...]because the church building, instead of costing us twenty thousand florins, is now costing us at least a hundred thousand [...] The architect has deceived us by increasing the length of the aforementioned church by twenty-nine feet, and many other things

— Complaint quoted by L-F. Genicot,

The initial plan was to re-integrate the old tower. An addition to the plan scrapped all the past elements. The plan to build a new tower was likely one of the many other things mentioned in the complaint. The conflict ended in court before the Sovereign Council of Brabant. The architect was forced to reduce the scale of the project, as evidenced by successive frontage projects and the size of the planned high elements on the original elevation drawing and actual elements as they were built. The construction continued with some delays, and the church was finished in 1753.

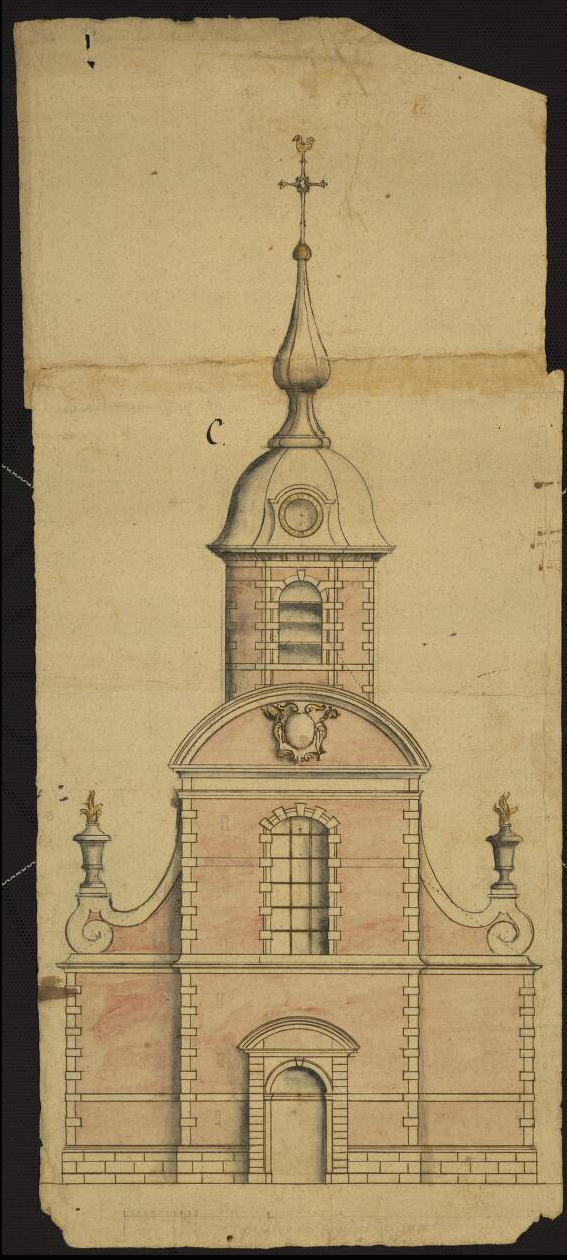
18th century drawing of a proposed new facade (sheet C)

The steeple was designed to hold three bells, however there is no formal proof of the existence of the third bell.

On the east side, a first bell from 1590 is adorned with the image of the Virgin and has the inscription: Micael Willelmus coadiutor Lobiensis me fecit – 1590 – Maître Jean Grongnart, founder

On the west side, the second bell was probably poorly cast because it was remelted in 1772, as shown by the inscription: + In the year 1772 I was remelted at the expense of the community of Jumet by Simon Chevresson and Deforest.

It's likely that the French Revolution caused damage because money was allocated by the local administration for the repair of window panes and the roof in 1797. In 1808, three new altars were built.

In 1835, the church underwent more significant restoration. Part of the pavement was replaced, a new set of furniture was put in, the altars transformed and the master altar re-dedicated.

In the brickwork of the master altar, removed during the 1968 restorations, a wooden reliquary casket with a glass lid was discovered. It contained two bones held together by a copper thread. Between them was a paper document in very bad shape, nearly unreadable, dated 1835. The reliquary may be even older, possibly having been placed there when the altar was re-dedicated.

In 1840, a pipe organ was installed, the work of organ builder Hypolite Loret of Brussels. The instrument was upgraded in 1873.

In 1943, German occupation authorities commandeered the bells; the 1590 bell was taken down and shipped to Germany. After the war, it was found and re-installed in the steeple.

== Architecture and furniture ==
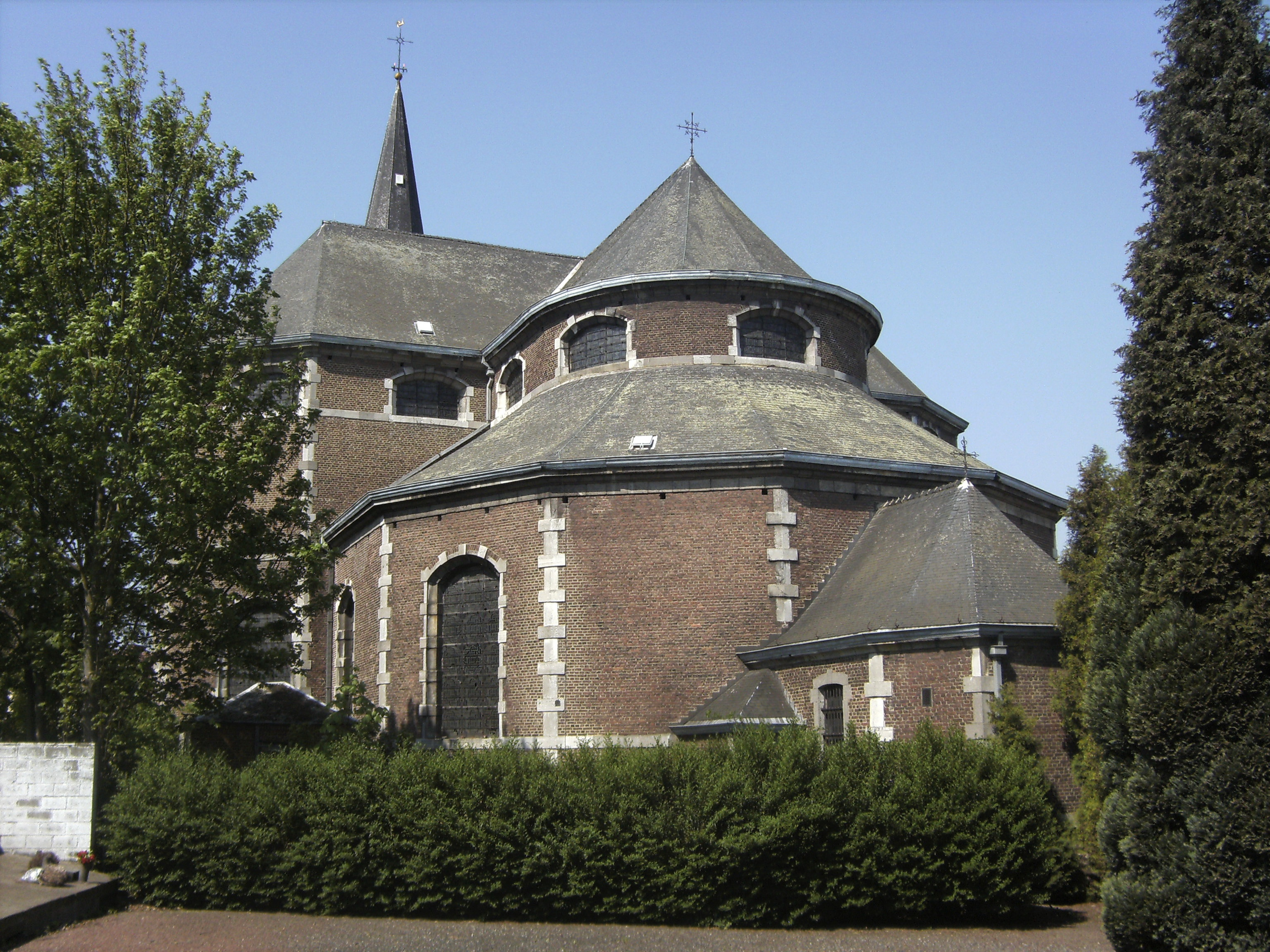
Chevet of the church

The church is made of brick and limestone and was built in the classic style. Overall, it is uniform in appearance. It's composed of six bayed naves flanked on either side by aisles, a three-sided transept and a choir with a polygonal ambulatory with a sacristy in its axis. The chamfered base is in dimension stone on the frontage, in rubble stones and sandstone for the rest. All the angles of the building are toothed and every second stone is bossed (Gibbs surround).

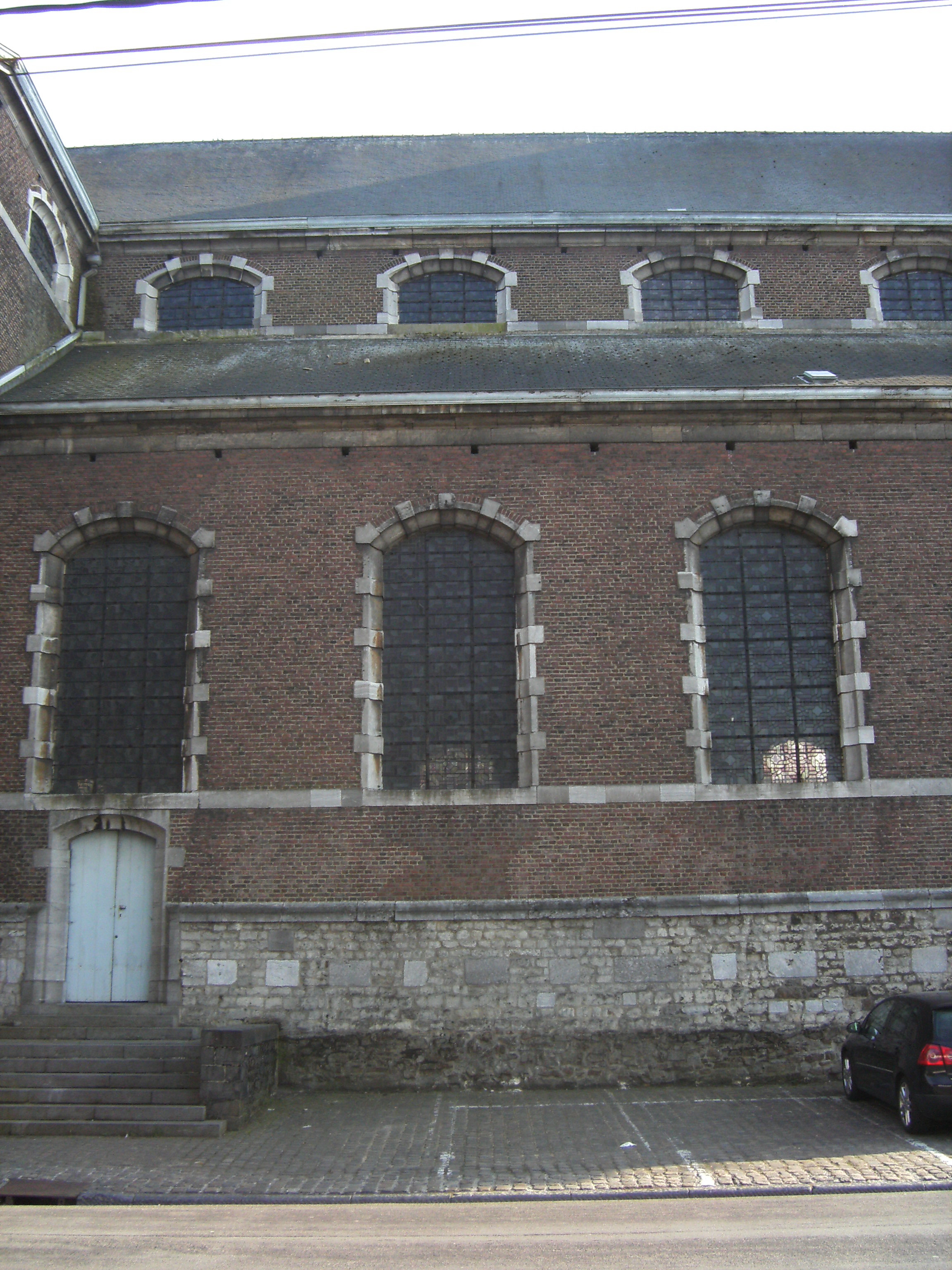
Exterior elevation of the first three bays of north aisle

The windows, except those of the tower, all have a gouged limestone frame cut with protruding teeth, with a curved arch and window aprons joined by a limestone band going around the whole building. Similarly conceived half-windows are found on the second level in the background, under the cornice.

The frontage has two levels, with above them a curved pediment. On the first level, two belts proceed further than the central part to the side frontages under the voluted ailerons placed on both sides of the second level. Above the pediment, a square tower is made up of two stories separated by a belt. The tower has a polygonal steeple on a pyramidal base. The limestone portal is preceded by several steps. It's flanked by pilasters with cross-walls that hold an entablature and a curved pediment. There is an arched door.

A secondary door, preceded by ten steps, is pierced in the first north aisle bay.

The interior is bright, painted in white and grey, and covered by barrel vaults. The columns of the nave are of the Tuscan style. The piers of the choir and of the transept are crowned with voluted capitals.

The church contains noted panelling and furniture.

In the church is a baptismal font from the 11th or 12th century consisting of a stone bowl slightly flared but circular, flanked by four engaged columns on a base. The columns end with a roughly cut human head, of which two out of four are missing. The style is Romanesque and the font archaic: straight nose and barely cleared, skin-deep eyes, mouth expressionless. These details are characteristic of Romanesque workshops from the 11th and 12th centuries. However, the Jumet arrangement differs from other known fonts in that the heads are borne directly by columns. Usually, the head is supported in cantilever by a kind of console, as in Gerpinnes for example.

The furniture also includes an altar devoted to Our Lady of Tongre and a communion bench, both dating to the 17th century.

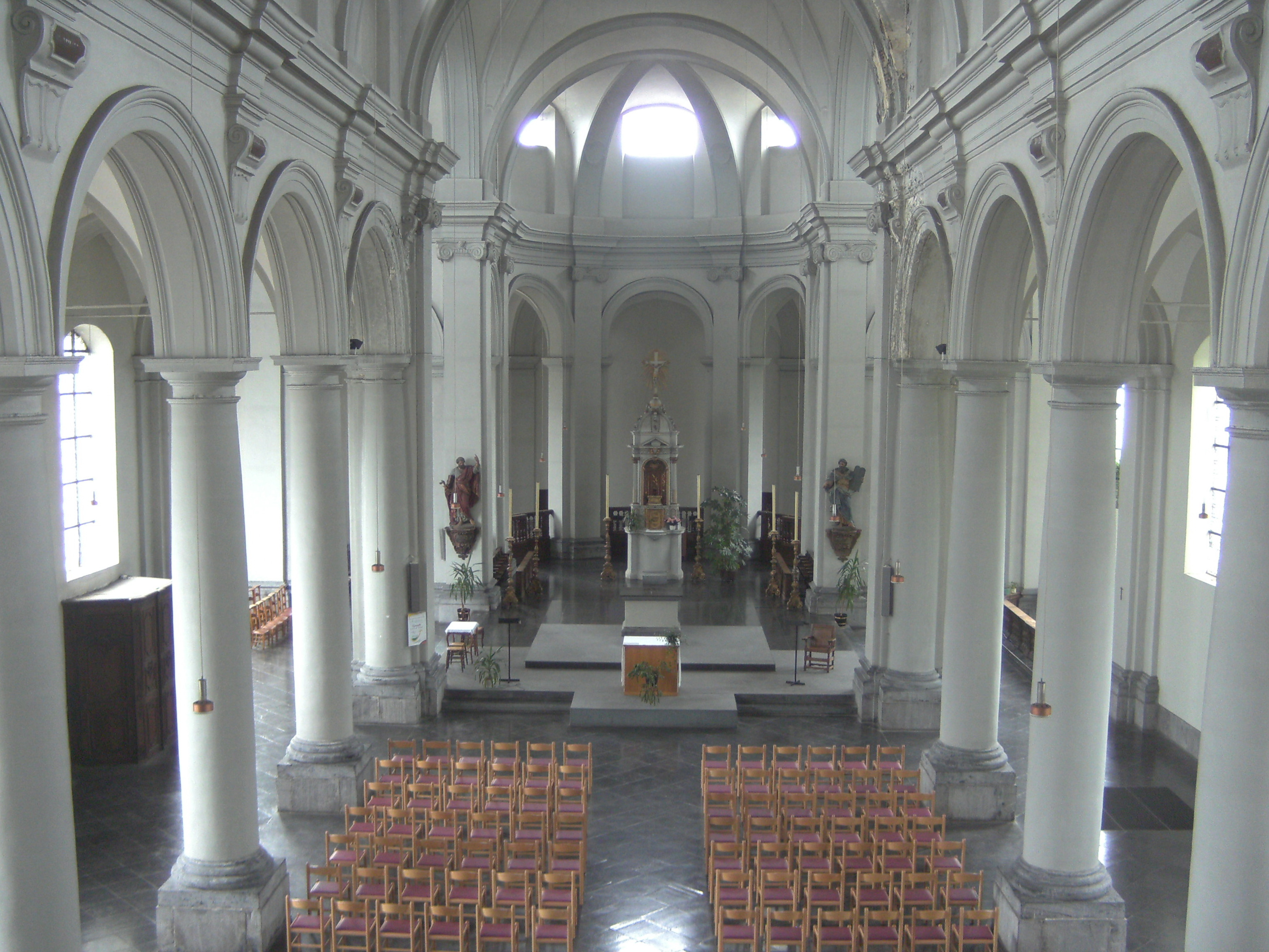
General view of the nave from the choir loft

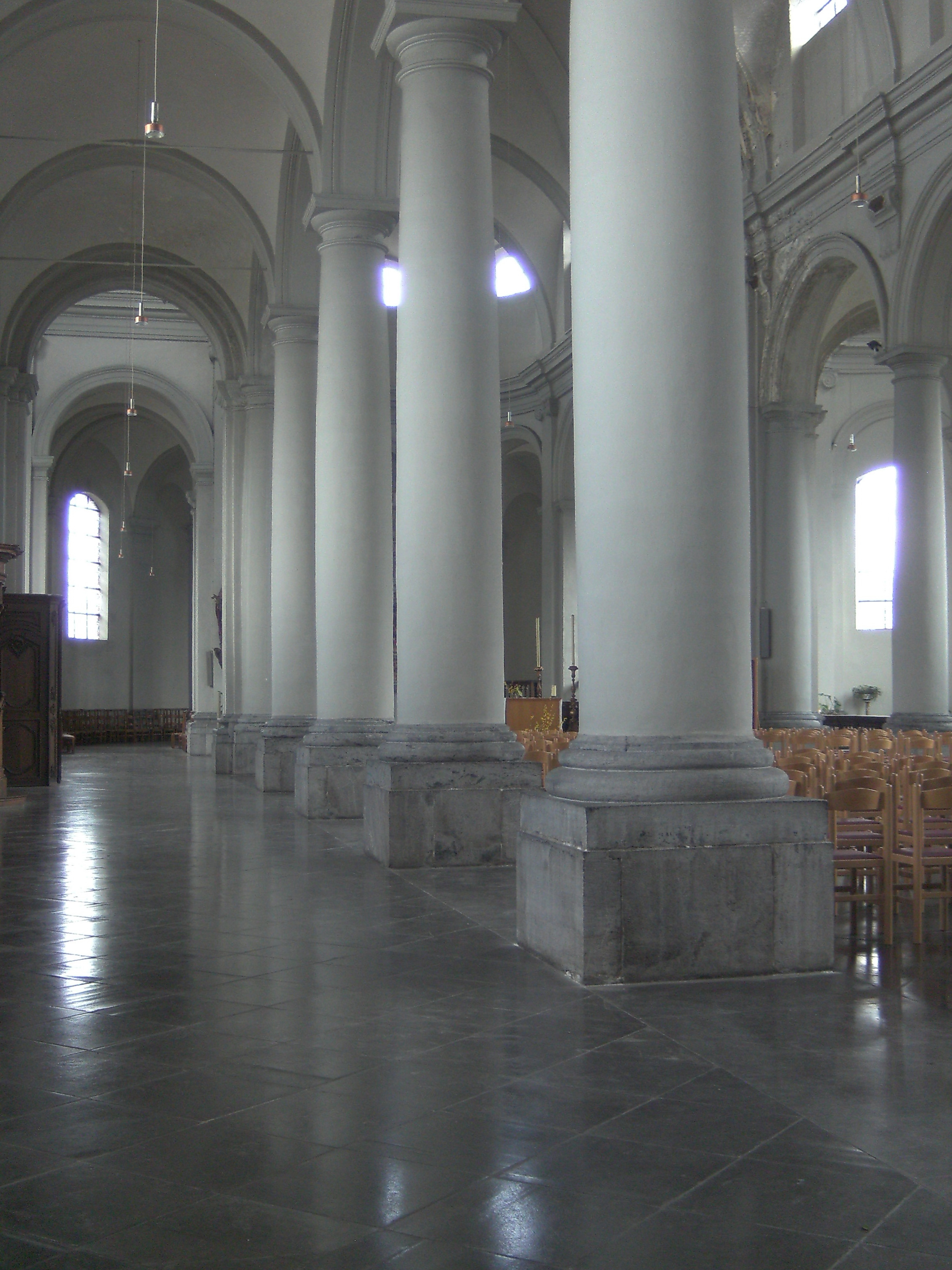
The north aisle and tuscan columns, towards the choir

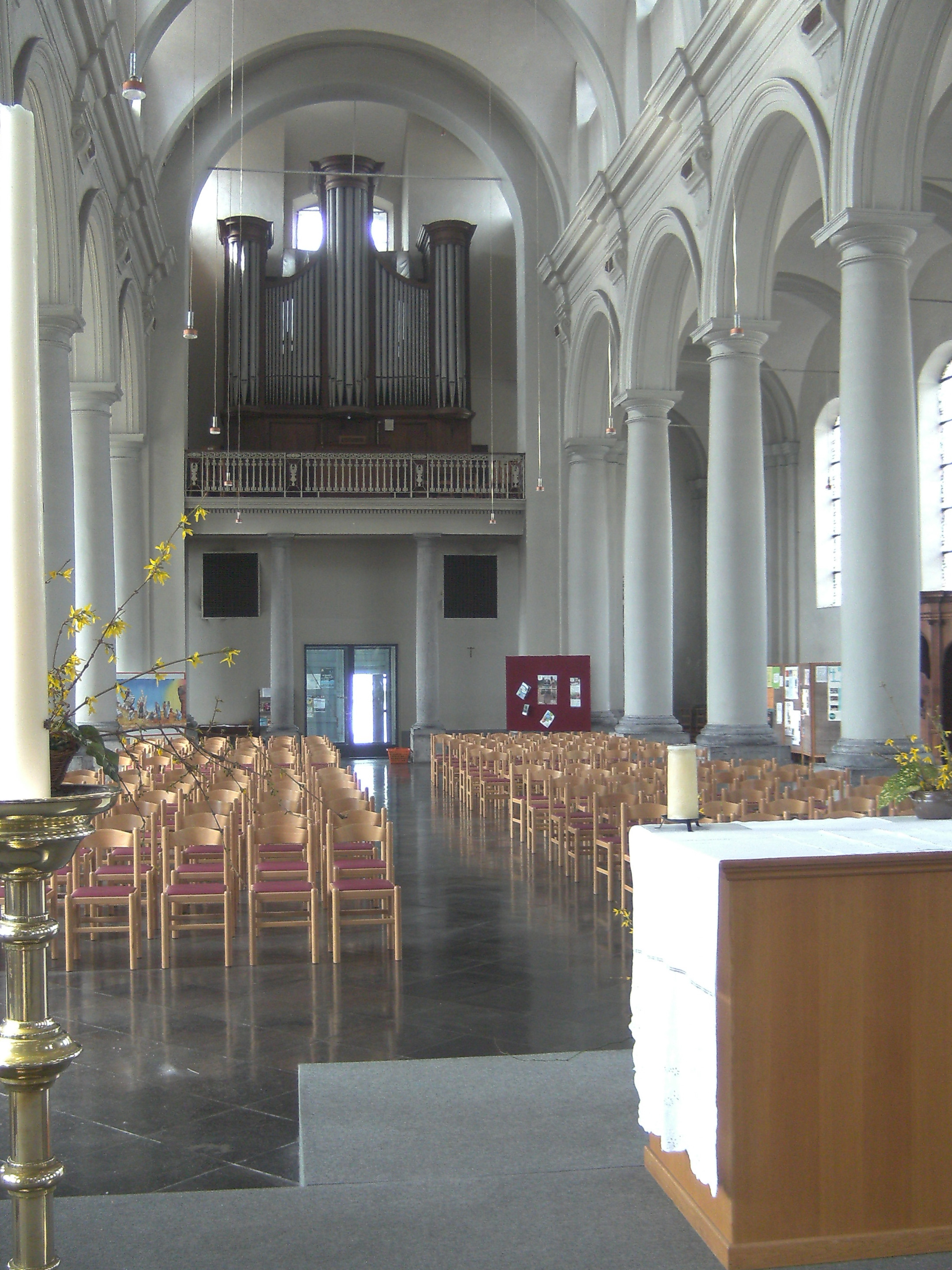
The nave and organs as seen from the choir

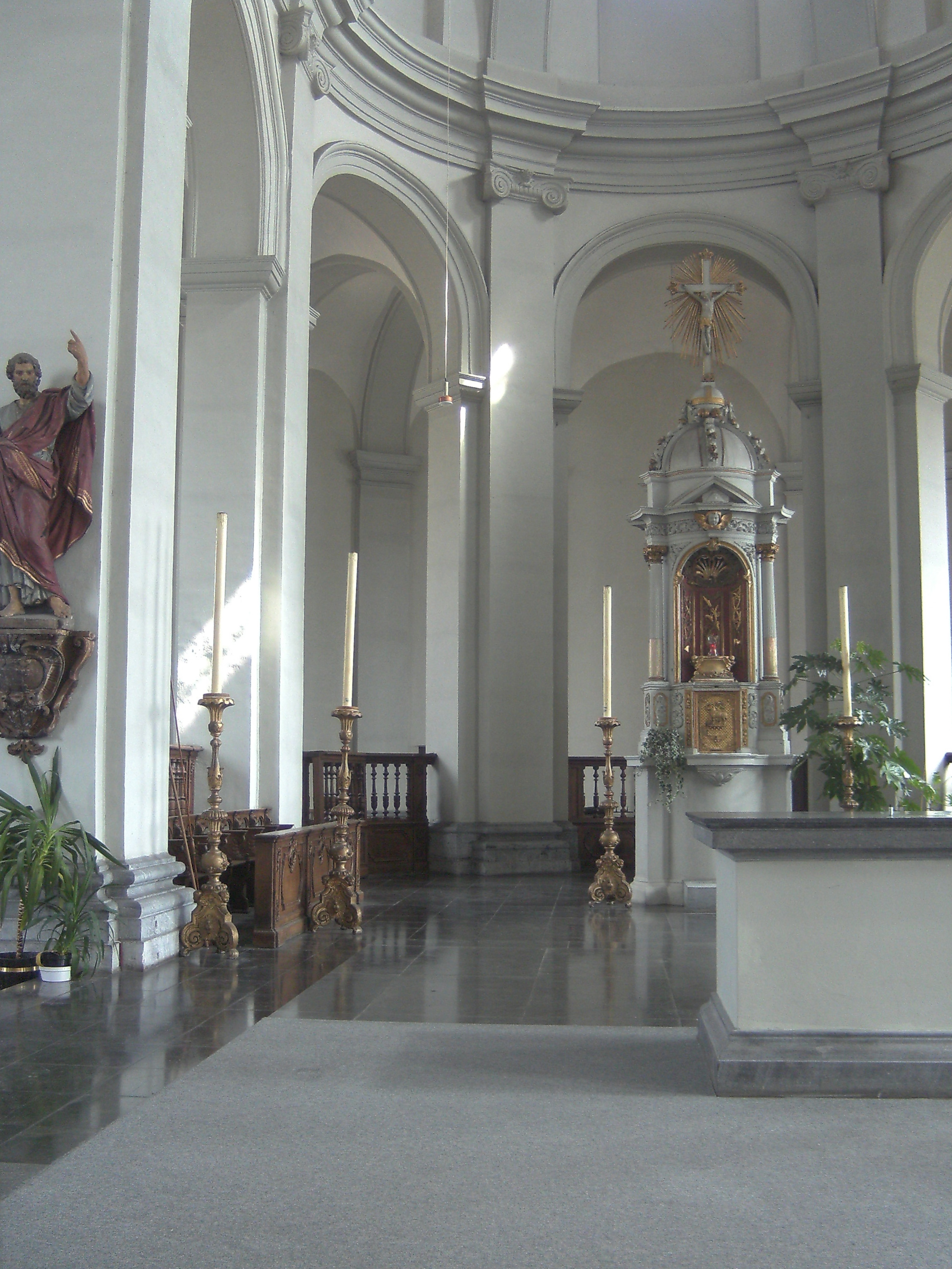
The choir with ambulatory, the tabernacle and the altar

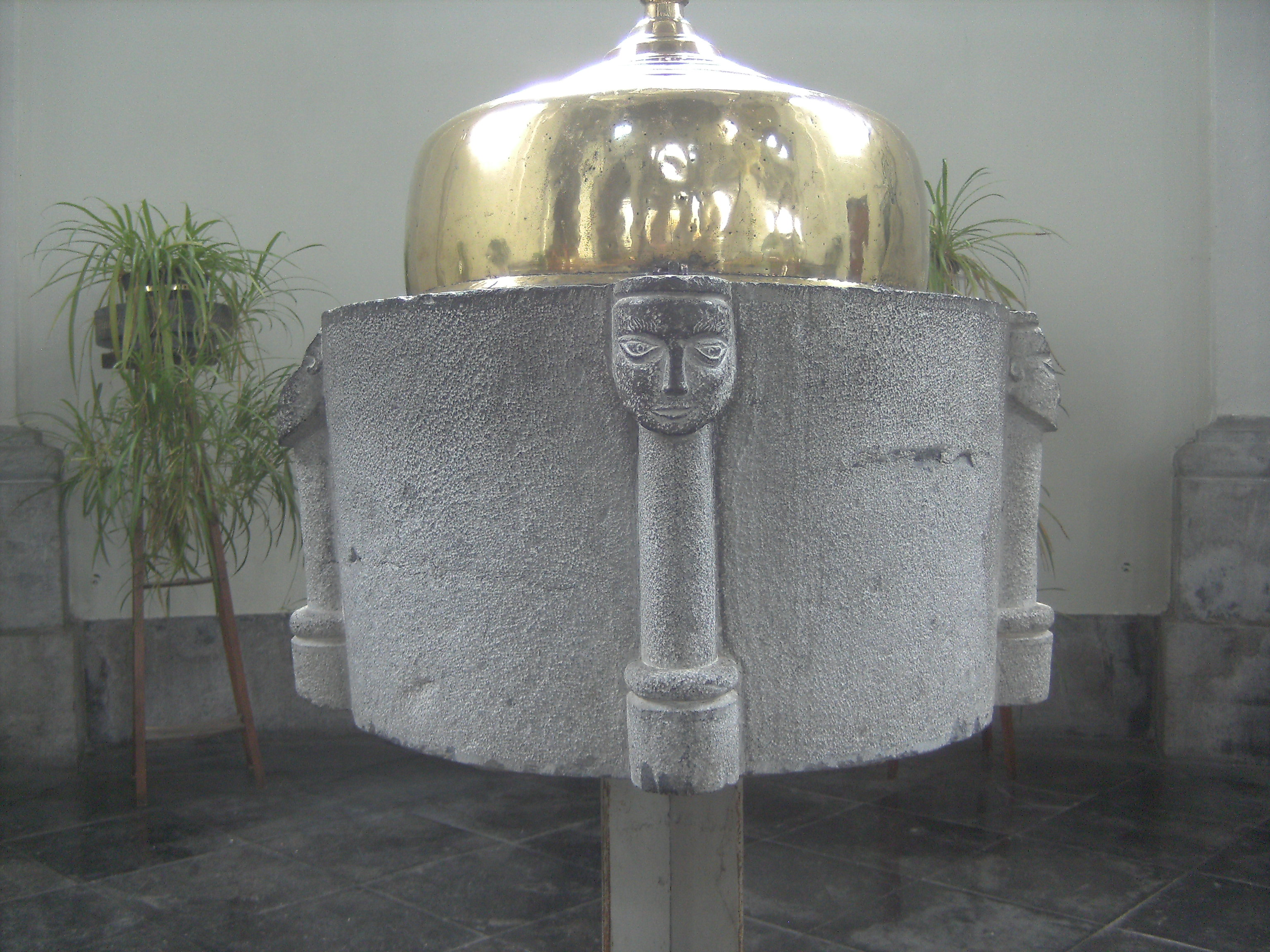
The baptismal font

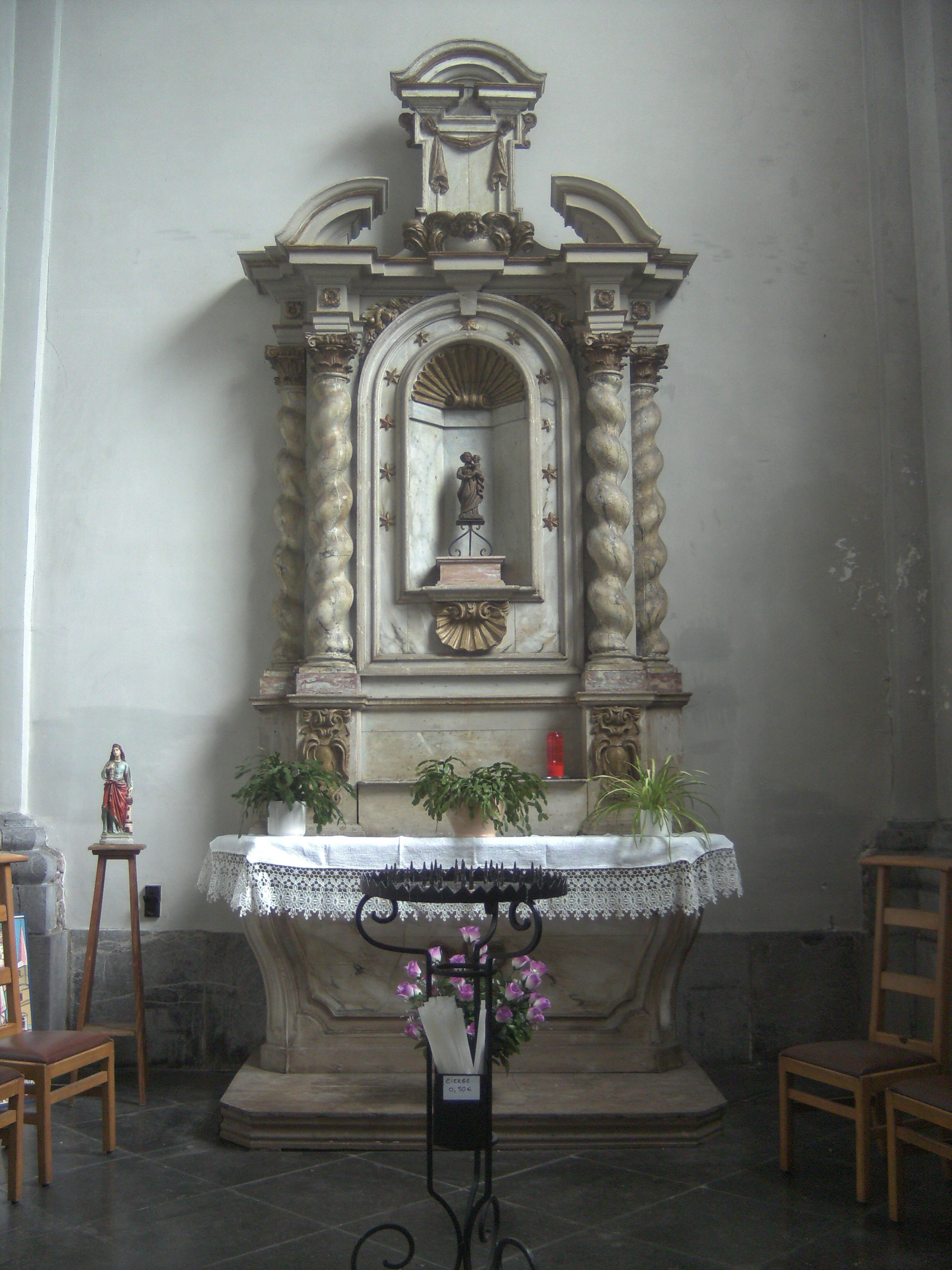
Altar devoted to our-Lady of Tongre

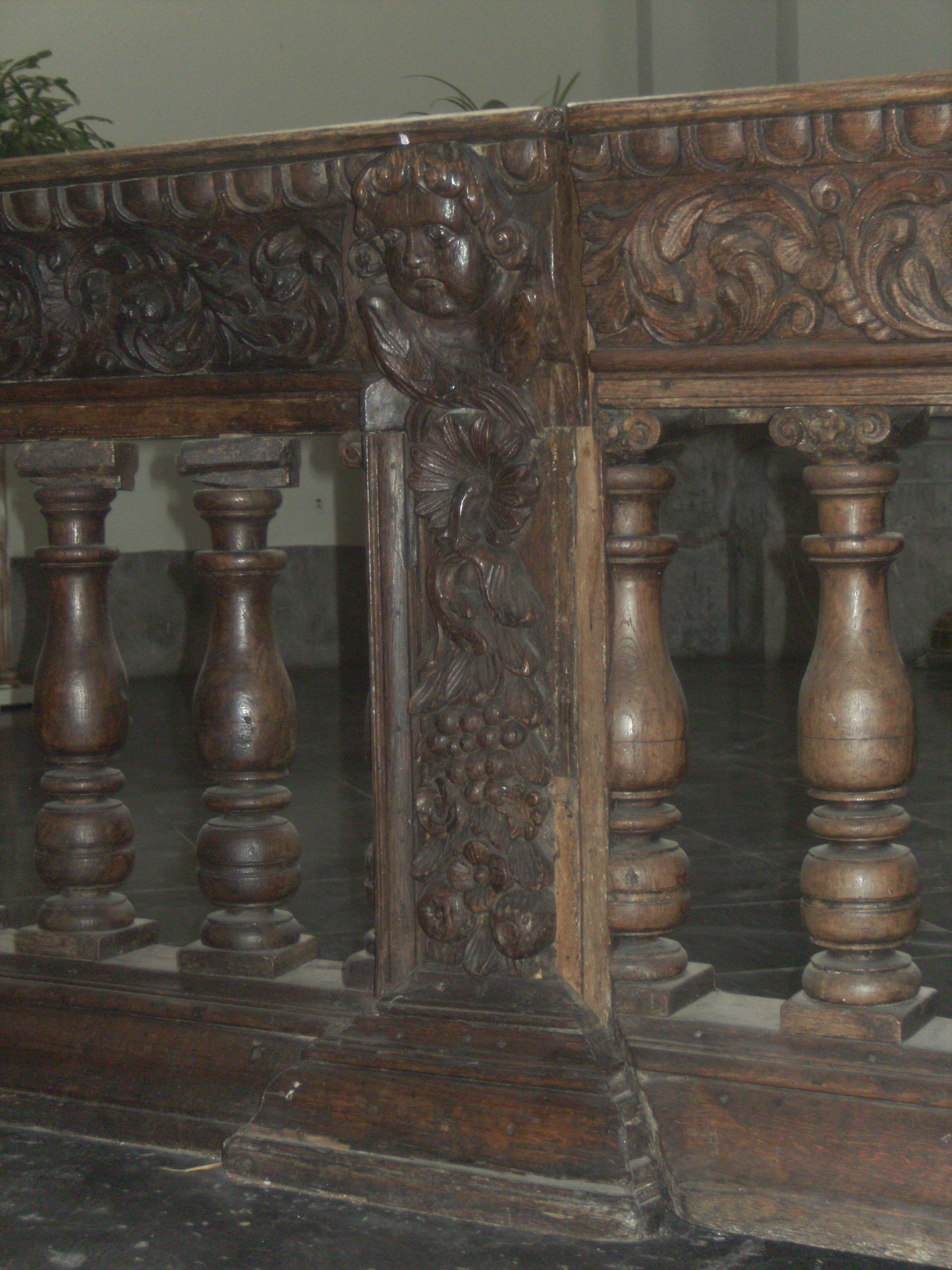
Communion bench

== See also ==
- List of protected heritage sites in Charleroi
- Jumet

== Bibliography ==
- Le patrimoine monumental de la Belgique, Wallonie, Hainaut, Arrondissement de Charleroi (in French). Vol. 20. Pierre Mardaga, éditeur. 1994. ISBN 2-87009-588-0. OCLC 312155565.
- Arcq, Robert (1973). Jumet, Pages d'histoire (in French). Jumet. OCLC 704497631.
- Brigode, Simon (1936). "Notes sur quelques sculptures anciennes conservées à Jumet". Bulletin de la Société royale d'archéologie et de paléontologie de Charleroi (in French): 6–10.
- Brutsaert, Emmanuel; Menne, Gilbert; De Meester, Johan (2009). Province du Hainaut, Histoire et patrimoine des communes de Belgique (in French). Bruxelles: Éditions Racine. ISBN 978-2-87386-599-3. OCLC 690552502.
- Genicot, Luc-Francis (1969). "Fouilles en l'église Saint-Sulpice de Jumet". Documents et rapports de la Société royale d'archéologie et de paléontologie de Charleroi (in French). LIV: 10–39.
- Maerten, Fabrice; Colignon, Alain (2012). La Wallonie sous l'Occupation, 1940-1945. Villes en guerre (in French). Bruxelles-Waterloo: SOMA-CEGES – Renaissance du Livre. ISBN 978-2-5070-5062-7. OCLC 821263376.
