= Cara Pils =

Brand of beer

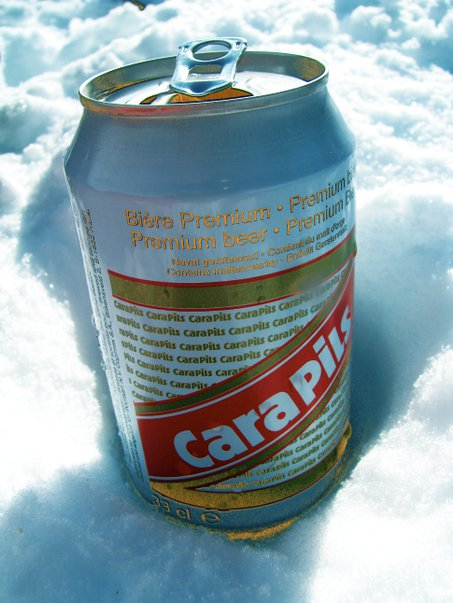
Can of Cara Pils

Cara Pils is a brand of beer, as well as a type of caramel malt, used in beer making.

The brewery that brews Cara Pils changes according to which brewery can make it the cheapest. Formerly brewed by Alken-Maes, it then was brewed until 2017 in France by Brasserie de Saint-Omer, in the Nord-Pas-de-Calais region, before being brewed again in Belgium.

The Belgian beer is brewed and canned for NV Copimex (since 2013 absorbed by FINCO (0429.127.109), which has subsequently been absorbed by Colruyt Group (0400.378.485) in 2023 after a group restructuring), and is sold in the Colruyt discount supermarket chain, as well as many other stores.

It is one of Belgium's cheapest beers, the history of the price can be found here: in 2016 a 33 cl can sells for €0.32. In 2021, the cookbook "Koken met CaraPils" (Dutch: "Cooking with CaraPils") was published by a student in collaboration with Colruyt.

Year	Price for 33cl
2016	€ 0.32
2017-2018	€ 0.33
2019-2020	€ 0.34
2021	€ 0.32
2022	€ 0.35
2024	€ 0.39

== Summary ==
- Belgian beer
- Alcohol: 4.4% ABV
- Available in 33 cl cans, 50 cl cans, and 25 cl bottles
- Exists in a non-alcoholic version (Cara Pils NA)
