= Compacted oxide layer glaze =

Compacted oxide layer glaze describes the often shiny, wear-protective layer of oxide formed when two metals (or a metal and ceramic) are slid against each other at high temperature in an oxygen-containing atmosphere. The layer forms on either or both of the surfaces in contact and can protect against wear.

== Background ==
A not often used definition of glaze is the highly sintered compacted oxide layer formed due to the sliding of either two metallic surfaces (or sometimes a metal surface and ceramic surface) at high temperatures (normally several hundred degrees Celsius) in oxidizing conditions. The sliding or tribological action generates oxide debris that can be compacted against one or both sliding surfaces and, under the correct conditions of load, sliding speed and oxide chemistry as well as (high) temperature, sinter together to form a 'glaze' layer. The 'glaze' formed in such cases is actually a crystalline oxide, with a very small crystal or grain size having been shown to approach nano-scale levels. Such 'glaze' layers were originally thought to be amorphous oxides of the same form as ceramic glazes, hence the name 'glaze' is still currently used.

Such 'glazes' have attracted limited attention due to their ability to protect the metallic surfaces on which they may form, from wear under the high temperature conditions in which they are generated. This high temperature wear protection allows potential use at temperatures beyond the range of conventional hydrocarbon-based, silicone-based or even solid lubricants such as molybdenum disulfide (the latter useful up to about 450 °C (842 °F) short term). Once they form, little further damage occurs unless there is a dramatic change in sliding conditions.

Such 'glazes' work by providing a mechanically resistant layer, which prevents direct contact between the two sliding surfaces. For example, when two metals slide against each other, there can be a high degree of adhesion between the surfaces. The adhesion may be sufficient to result in metallic transfer from one surface to the other (or removal and ejection of such material) - effectively adhesive wear (also referred to as severe wear). With the 'glaze' layer present, such severe adhesive interactions cannot occur and wear may be greatly reduced. The continued generation of oxidized debris during the more gradual wear that results (entitled mild wear) can sustain the 'glaze' layer and maintain this low wear regime.

However, their potential application has been hampered as they have only successfully been formed under the very sliding conditions where they are meant to offer protection. A limited amount of sliding damage (referred to as 'run in wear' - actually a brief period of adhesive or severe wear) needs to occur before the oxides are generated and such 'glaze' layers can form. Efforts at encouraging their early formation have met with very limited success, and the damage inflicted during the 'run in' period is one factor preventing this technique being used for practical applications.

To bypass the requirement for severe run-in wear and enable glaze-like protection, synthetic glaze-based ceramic coatings have been engineered. For instance, thermal spray coatings utilizing CoO–Cr_{2}O_{3} have been shown to rapidly generate lubricious, cobalt oxide-rich glaze layers directly at the sliding interface. The preferential formation of a top layer composed of cobalt oxides closely mirrors the naturally occurring glaze formation mechanisms observed on cobalt-based superalloys during high-temperature fretting wear, where initial chromium consumption gives way to an effective cobalt oxide-rich contact layer that establishes a steady low-wear regime. This provides immediate high-temperature wear and friction reduction while mitigating the destructive initial wear typically needed to generate naturally occurring oxide glazes.

As oxide generated is effectively the result of the tribochemical decay of one or both of the metallic (or ceramic) surfaces in contact, the study of compacted oxide layer glazes is sometimes referred to as part of the more general field of high temperature corrosion.

The generation of oxides during high temperature sliding wear does not automatically lead to the production of a compacted oxide layer 'glaze'. Under certain conditions (potentially due to non-ideal conditions of sliding speed, load, temperature or oxide chemistry / composition), the oxide may not sinter together and instead the loose oxide debris may assist or enhance the removal of material by abrasive wear. A change in conditions may also see a switch from the formation of a loose, abrasive oxide to the formation of wear protective compacted oxide glaze layers and vice versa, or even the reappearance of adhesive or severe wear. Due to the complexities of the conditions controlling the types of wear observed, there have been a number of attempts to map types of wear with reference to sliding conditions in order to help better understand and predict them.

== Potential uses ==
Due to the potential for wear protection at high temperatures beyond which conventional lubricants can be used, possible uses have been speculated in applications such as car engines, power generation and even aerospace, where there is an increasing demand for ever higher efficiency and thus operating temperature.

== Compacted oxide layers at low temperatures ==
Compacted oxide layers can form due to sliding at low temperatures and offer some wear protection; however, in the absence of heat as a driving force (either due to frictional heating or higher ambient temperature), they cannot sinter together to form more protective 'glaze' layers.

== See also ==
- Tribology
- Wear
