= Maes pils =

Belgian beer brewed by Alken-Maes

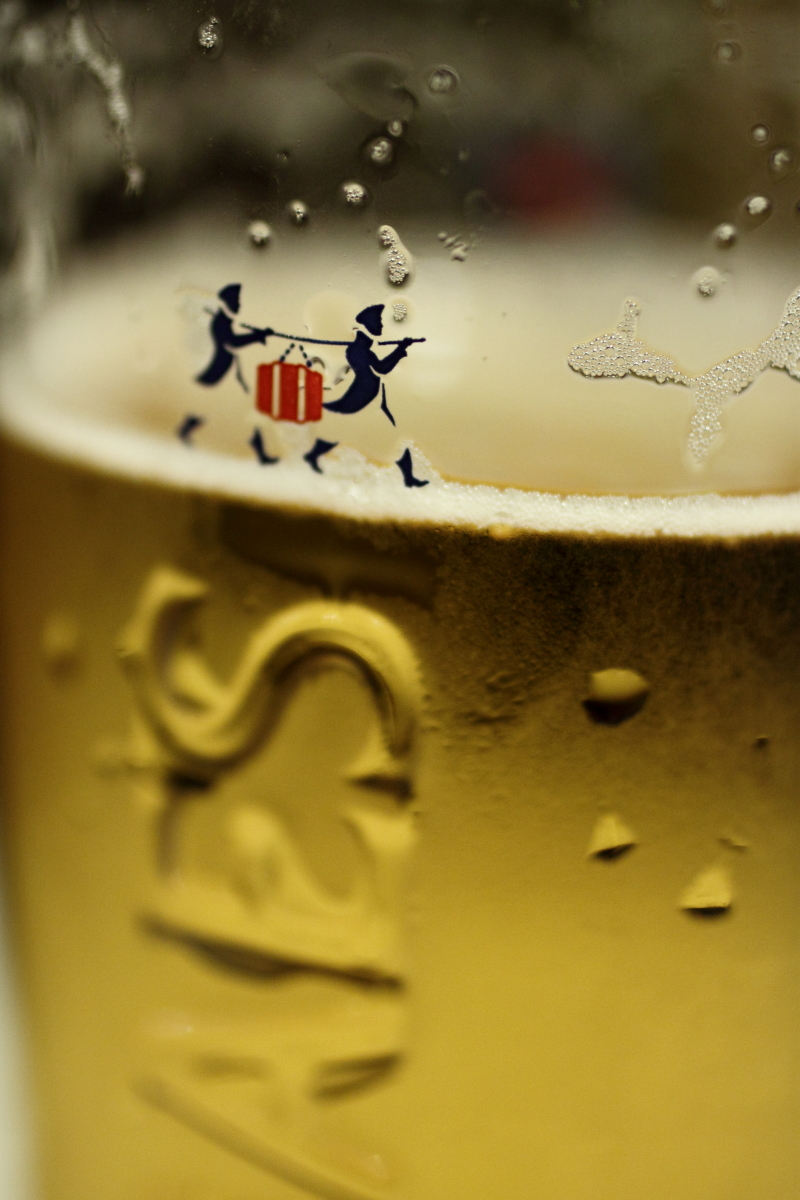
Maes pils logo

Maes pils is a Belgian pils brewed by Alken-Maes. The beer was first produced in 1930 for Antwerp's Universal Exposition and called Prima Maezenbier. After Jupiler and Stella Artois, it is the third best-selling pilsner in Belgium.

In 2008, Alken-Maes was taken over by the Dutch Heineken Brewery.

In 2009, Alken-Maes changed the recipe of Maes Pils, resulting in a slight change in taste and a rise in the percentage of alcohol from 4.9% to 5.2%. To mark the change, Maes was rebranded with a new logo, a new embossed bottle, and a new descriptive slogan: "Extra Mout/Extra Malt".

== Summary ==
- Alcohol: 5.2% ABV
- Available in 25 cl, 33 cl and 75 cl bottles or in 25 cl, 33 cl and 50 cl cans. Can also be found in 5-litre kegs.
