= Grimbergen (beer) =

Brand name of a variety of Belgian beers

Grimbergen (Belgium)
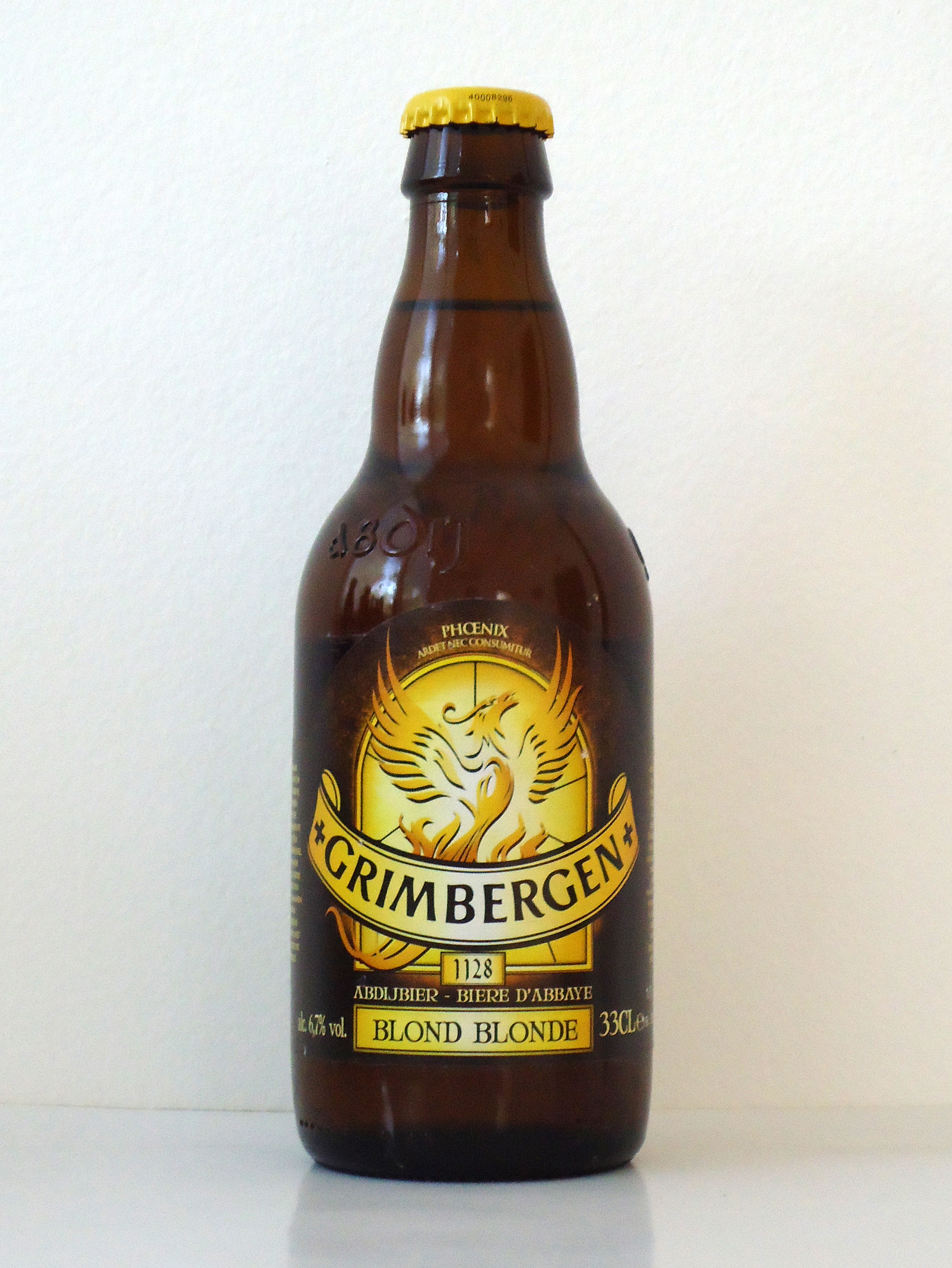
- Location: Alken, Belgium
- Owned by: Alken-Maes

Active beers
Name	Type
Grimbergen Blonde	bright beer
Grimbergen Double Ambrée	Brown
Grimbergen Tripel	Blond
Optimo Bruno	Brown
Grimbergen Goud 8°	Blond
Grimbergen Belgian Pale Ale	Belgian Pale Ale
Grimbergen Blanche	Wheat beer

Grimbergen is the brand name of a variety of Belgian abbey beers. Originally made by Norbertine monks in the Belgian town of Grimbergen, it is now brewed by different breweries in Belgium, France, Poland and Italy.

== History ==
The name derives from the Norbertine abbey, which Saint Norbert of Xanten founded in Grimbergen in 1128. It is in this abbey that the beer was first brewed by the monks. They became famous for providing hospitality and their home-brewed beer to visitors. The monks reputedly handed down the recipe over the centuries. When French invaders closed down the monastery at the end of the 18th century, the brewing activities here stopped also. Later, when the abbey was re-established, the brewing activities were not resumed and the monks ordered their beer from local breweries.

== Current breweries ==
In 1958 Brouwerij Maes (Maes Brewery) contacted the monks at the abbey with the proposal to commercialize the dark beer that Maes had developed under the brand name "Grimbergen". Until 1978, Grimbergen Dubbel and Tripel were brewed in the brewery in Waarloos (part of the municipality of Kontich). After that date, the production moved to Brasserie Union in Jumet. Since the closure of the plant in Jumet in 2007, the production moved to the Brouwerij van Alken (Brewery of Alken) located in Alken.

The beers marketed under the brand name Grimbergen are now brewed by two different companies. Alken-Maes located in Alken in Belgium brewed the beer before 2008. Alken-Maes was taken over by Heineken International in 2008. As part of the takeover the brand name Grimbergen was transferred to Carlsberg Group, but Heineken was given a long-term license to use the brand name in Belgium. As a result Alken-Maes brews the beer for the Belgian market, while Carlsberg is responsible for the marketing outside Belgium of the beers that it brews under the Grimbergen name at its Kronenbourg Brewery located in France. In the Netherlands, Grolsch Brewery is responsible for the marketing of Grimbergen that is brewed by Alken-Maes. This is however no longer that simple! According to the bottle declaration, the 330 ml bottles are made by Carlsberg's brewery in Poland. The green variety Belgian Pale Ale (75cl) is likewise brewed at Carlsberg Italia, Induno Olona. In 2019, the abbey announced that it would start producing its own beer again, which increased the number of producers to three instead of two.

== Varieties ==
The Alken Maes brewery in Belgium and the Kronenbourg Brewery in France have developed different varieties. The Belgian varieties are: Blond, Dubbel (brown), Tripel (blond), Optimo Bruno (brown), and the latest innovation Grimbergen Gold (blond).

In France there is a range of different varieties that are unknown in the country of origin:

- La Blonde - 6.7%
- La Rouge - 6%
- La Ambrée - 6.5%
- La Blanche - 6%
- La Réserve - 8.5%

A limited edition Christmas Beer (Brassin de Noël) is sometimes produced for the year-end festivities.

== Label and slogan ==
The label on the beer Grimbergen has always featured the mythological phoenix. In late 2010 the label was thoroughly renovated: the phoenix came more to the forefront and was modernized. The top of the label reads: "Phoenix", and below "Ardet nec consumitur". This means "burned but not destroyed." This is the slogan of the abbey and refers both to the Burning Bush of scripture (which burned but was not destroyed by the flames), and to the fact that the abbey has been destroyed by fire many times and was always rebuilt and was able to survive. In other words, it rose again like a phoenix.

== Gallery ==
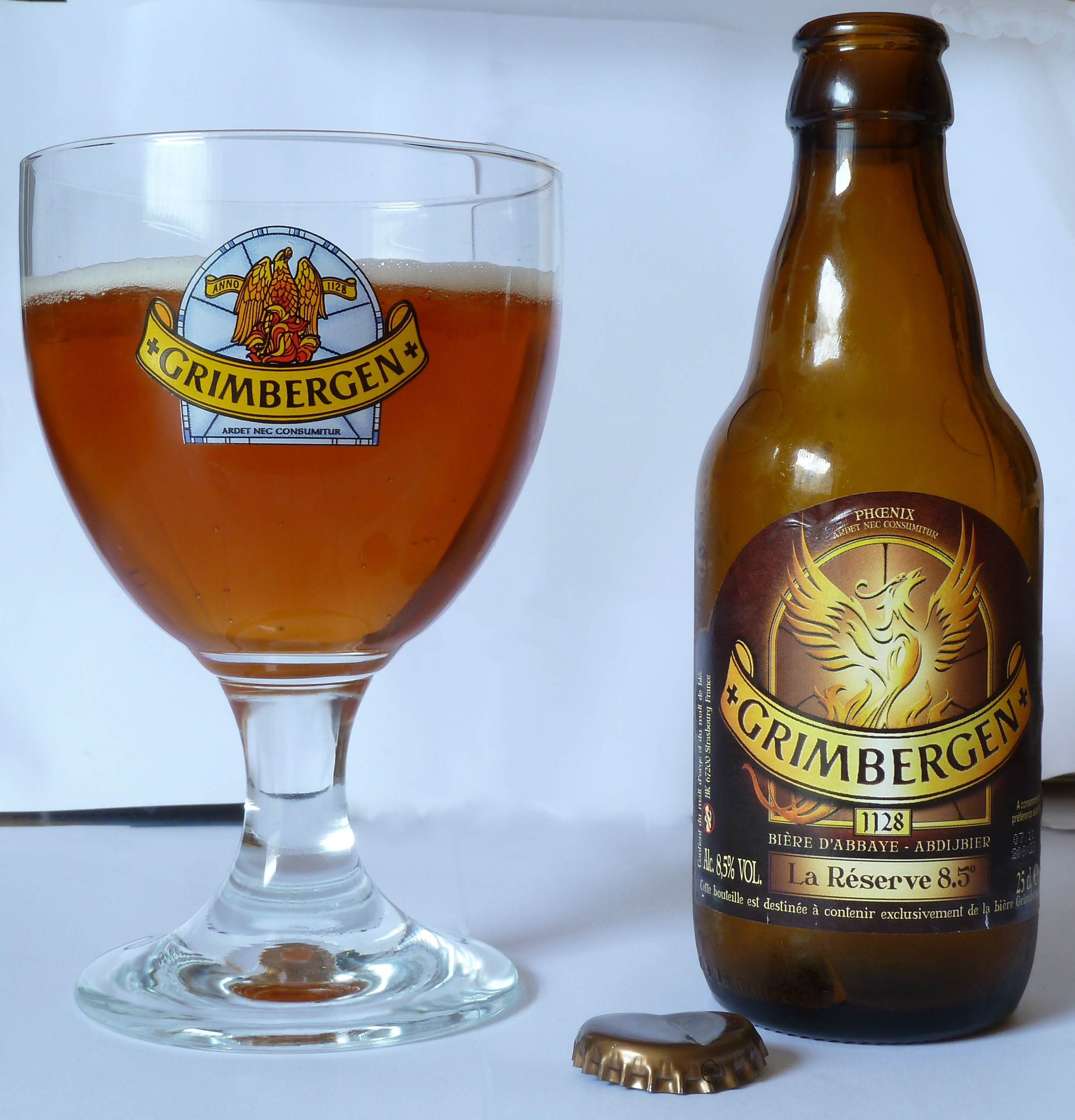
Traditional Grimbergen glass

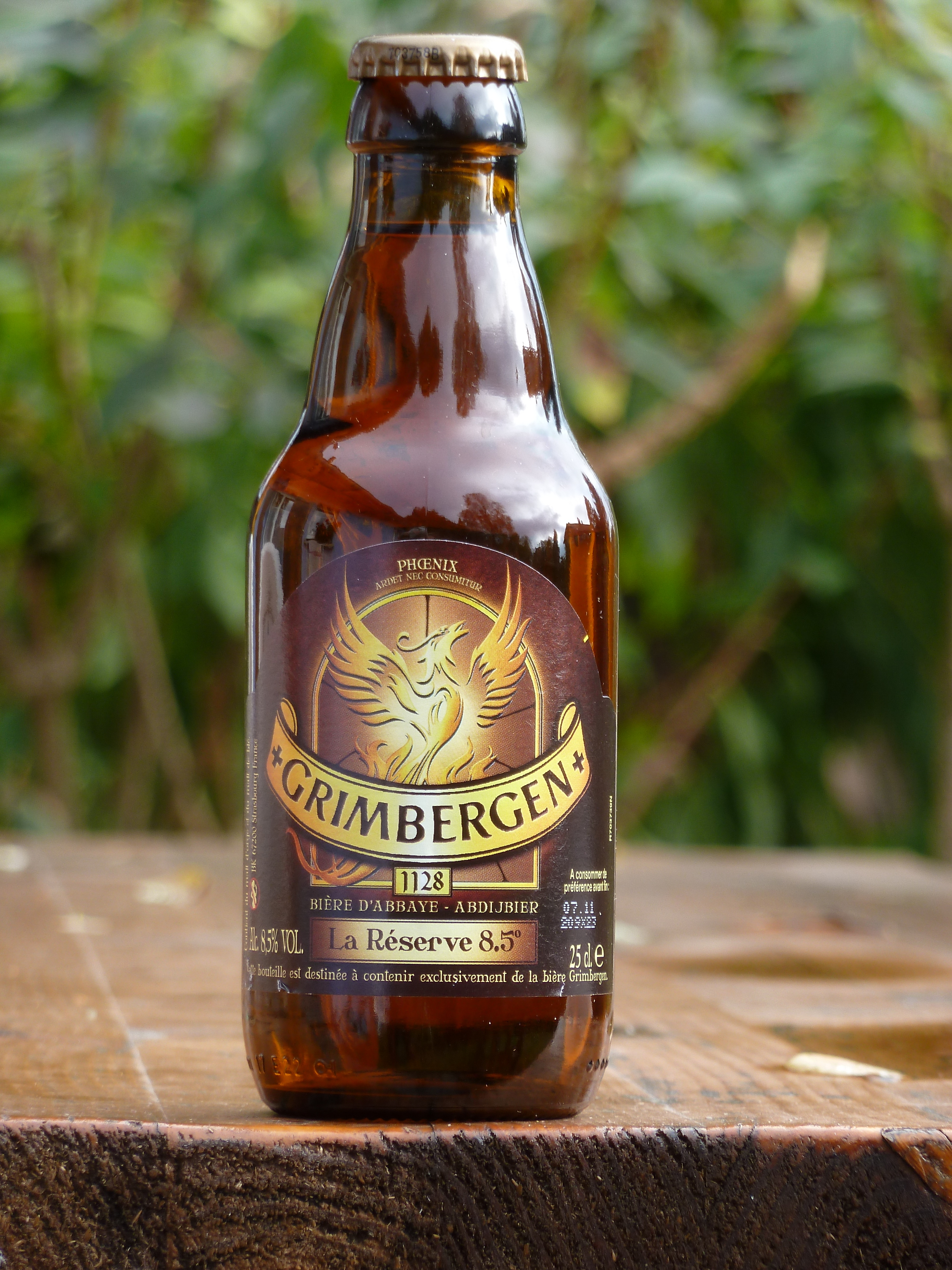
La Réserve 8.5°
