= Jumet =

Jumet Djumet (Walloon)
- Former municipality of Belgium
- Coat of arms

- Location in the municipality of Charleroi

- Location in Belgium
- Coordinates: 50°26′N 4°26′E
- Country: Belgium
- Region: Wallonia
- Community: French Community
- Province: Hainaut
- Municipality: Charleroi

Area
  - Total: 4.81 sq mi (12.47 km^{2})

Population (2001)
  - Total: 23,973
- Time zone: UTC+1 (CET)
  - Summer (DST): UTC+2 (CEST)
- Postal code: 6040
- Area code: 071

Jumet (Walloon: Djumet) is a town of Wallonia and a district of the municipality of Charleroi, located in the province of Hainaut, Belgium.

It was a municipality of its own before the merger of the municipalities in 1977. Church of Saint-Sulpice, Jumet is a Roman Catholic church in Jumet.

The historic Union brewery at Jumet produced a local speciality Cuvee and a range of top-fermenting beers for its parent, Maes, but was closed in 2007. Grimbergen was one of the beers moved to Brasserie Union in Jumet, but since the closure of the plant in Jumet in 2007, the production moved to the Brouwerij van Alken.

In 1995, Jumet was the site of the murder of two teenage girls by notorious Belgian serial killer, Marc Dutroux. The property has since been demolished and in its place now stands a monument to the victims.

== Gallery ==
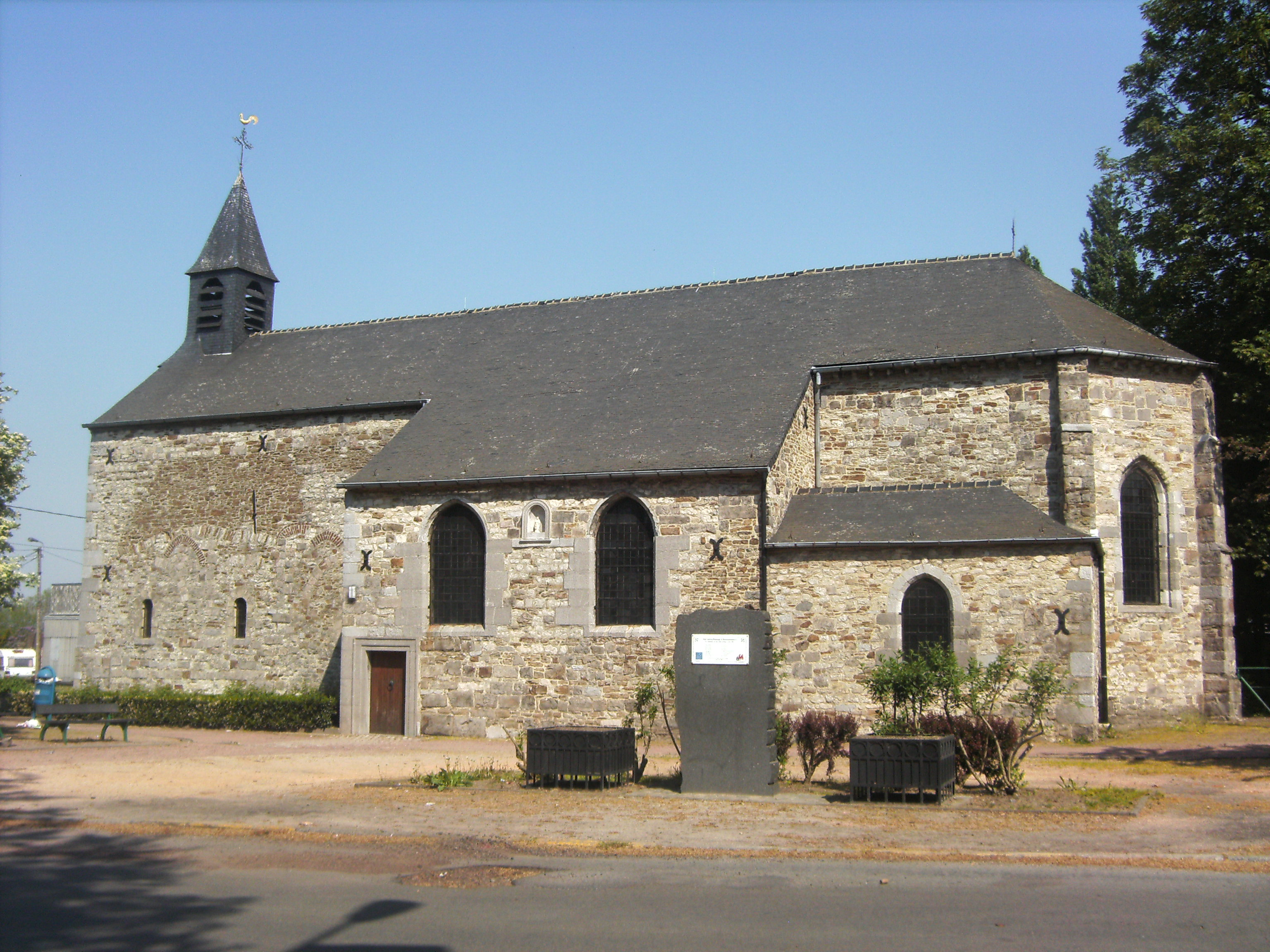
Notre-Dame de Heigne chapel (12th century).

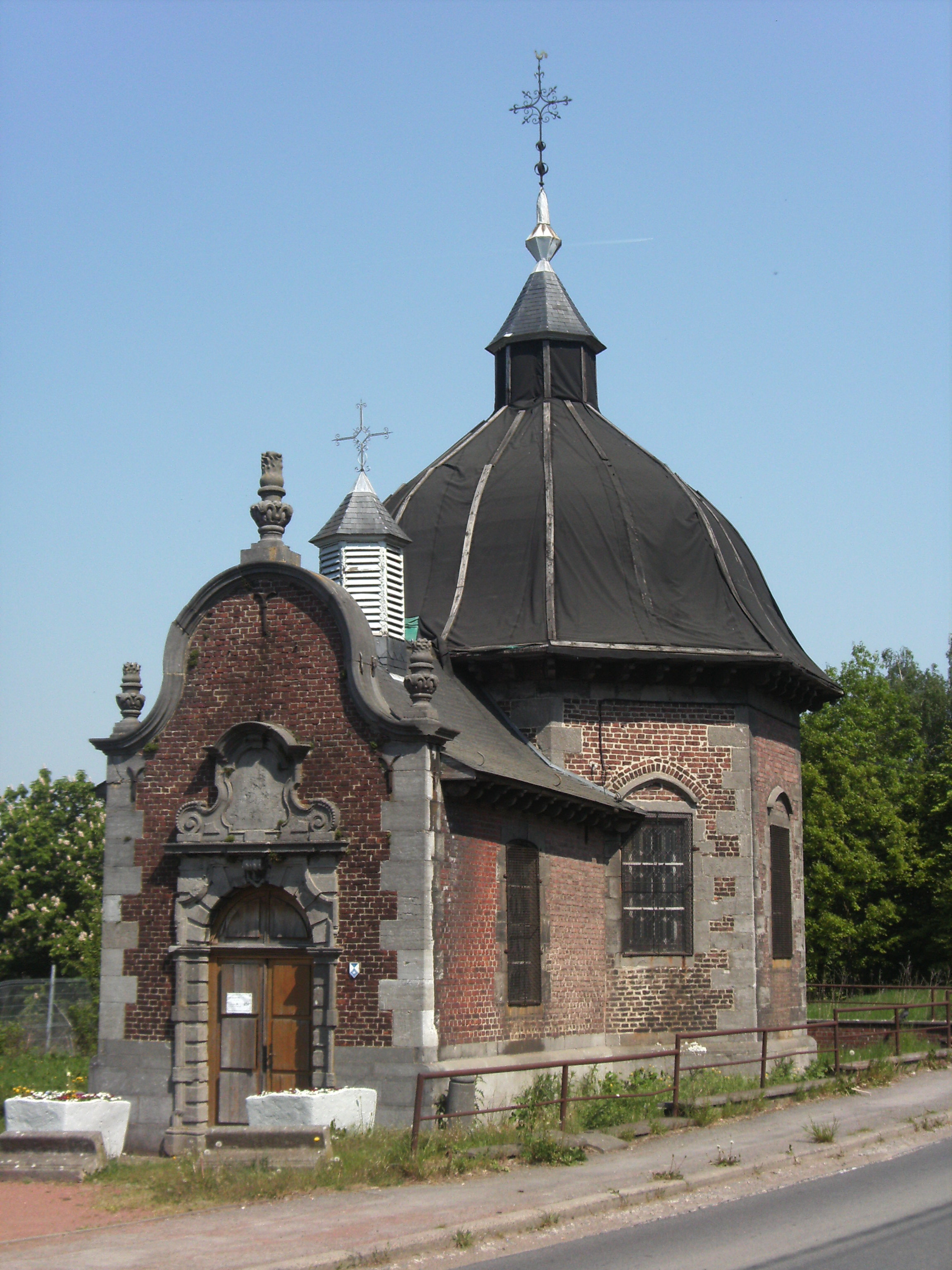
Notre-Dame des Affligés chapel (1677; 1707).

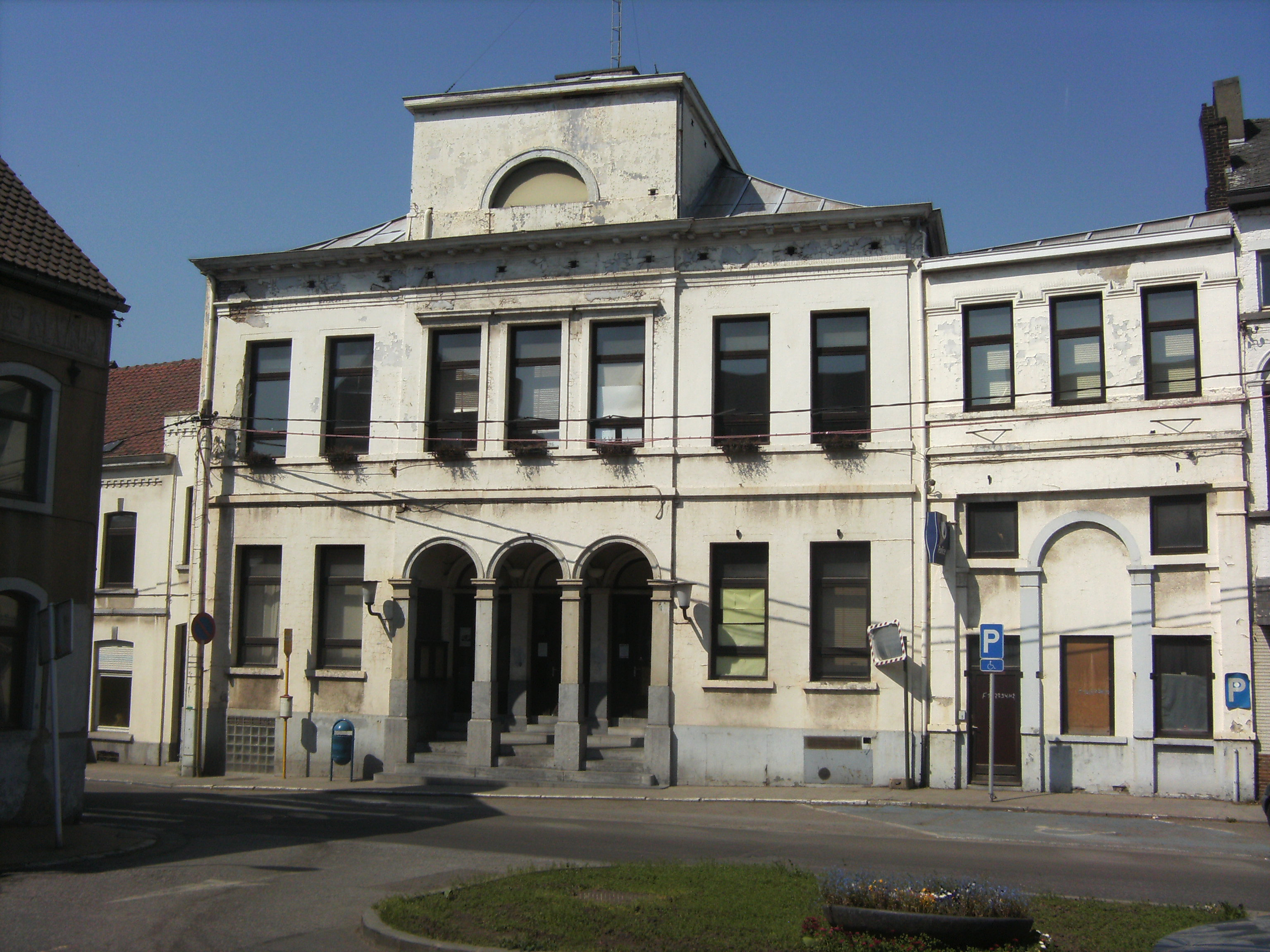
Former town hall.
