= List of protected heritage sites in Charleroi =

This table shows an overview of the protected heritage sites in the Walloon town Charleroi. This list is part of Belgium's national heritage.

Object	Year/architect	Town/section	Address	Coordinates	Number^{?}	Image
Church of Saint-Christophe ^{(nl)} ^{(fr)}		Charleroi		50.411906°N 4.445351°E	52011-CLT-0001-01 Info	Kerk Saint-Christophe
Barracks Caporal Trésignies: porch and two towers of the main entrance ^{(nl)} ^{(fr)}		Charleroi	boulevard Général Michel n°1b	50.411058°N 4.450904°E	52011-CLT-0003-01 Info	Kazerne Caporal Trésignies: portiek en twee torens van de hoofdingang
Church of Saint-Laurent ^{(nl)} ^{(fr)}		Charleroi		50.394709°N 4.466795°E	52011-CLT-0005-01 Info	Kerk Saint-Laurent
Chapel of Saint-Ghislain: choir of the old church ^{(nl)} ^{(fr)}		Charleroi	rue Vieille église,	50.413719°N 4.426338°E	52011-CLT-0007-01 Info	Kapel Saint-Ghislain: koor van de oude kerk
Bois-Lombut (part) ^{(nl)} ^{(fr)}		Charleroi		50.464758°N 4.445162°E	52011-CLT-0008-02 Info	
Bois-Lombut (part) ^{(nl)} ^{(fr)}		Charleroi		50.467803°N 4.446022°E	52011-CLT-0010-01 Info	
Church of Saint-Jean: lower tower and three beech trees ^{(nl)} ^{(fr)}		Charleroi		50.465314°N 4.429768°E	52011-CLT-0011-01 Info	Kerk Saint-Jean: onderste deel toren en drie beuken
Chapel Notre-Dame de Heigne ^{(nl)} ^{(fr)}		Charleroi	place du Prieuré	50.445940°N 4.406230°E	52011-CLT-0012-01 Info	Kapel Notre-Dame de Heigne
Church of Saint-Sulpice ^{(nl)} ^{(fr)}		Charleroi		50.450851°N 4.426090°E	52011-CLT-0013-01 Info	Kerk Saint-Sulpice
Chapel Notre-Dame des Affligés ^{(nl)} ^{(fr)}		Charleroi	rue de Gosselies	50.454662°N 4.428108°E	52011-CLT-0014-01 Info	Kapel Notre-Dame des Affligés
St. Martin's Church ^{(nl)} ^{(fr)}		Charleroi		50.400156°N 4.448372°E	52011-CLT-0016-01 Info	Kerk Saint-Martin
Castle, entrance pavilion and old rectories: roofs and estab ^{(nl)} ^{(fr)}		Charleroi	Place albert Ier	50.409099°N 4.380395°E	52011-CLT-0017-01 Info	Kasteel, entreepaviljoen en oude pastorieën: geves en daken
Chapel du Calvaire ^{(nl)} ^{(fr)}		Charleroi	place Albert Ier	50.400914°N 4.481066°E	52011-CLT-0018-01 Info	Kapel du Calvaire
Chateau Cartier: porch, castle, base of the walls, except the dovecote ^{(nl)} ^{(fr)}		Charleroi	Place Albert Ier	50.406764°N 4.393772°E	52011-CLT-0022-01 Info	Kasteel Cartier: portiek, kasteel, onderbouw van de muren, uitgezonderd de duiventil
Chateau Cartier and environment ^{(nl)} ^{(fr)}		Charleroi		50.406783°N 4.393651°E	52011-CLT-0023-01 Info	
Church of Notre-Dame de l'Assomption and its baroque altar ^{(nl)} ^{(fr)}		Charleroi		50.441068°N 4.392413°E	52011-CLT-0025-01 Info	Kerk Notre-Dame de l'Assomption en diens barokke altaar
Terrils du Martinet and protection zone ^{(nl)} ^{(fr)}		Charleroi		50.430269°N 4.384517°E	52011-CLT-0026-01 Info	Terrils van Martinet en instelling beschermingszone
Abbey of Saint-Michel: the monastic buildings (facades and roofs), the former church of Saint-Michel and environment ^{(nl)} ^{(fr)}		Charleroi	rue du Canal.	50.455526°N 4.404448°E	52011-CLT-0028-01 Info	Oude priorij van Saint-Michel: de kloostergebouwen (gevels en daken), de voormalige kerk Saint-Michel en omgeving
Porte of Waterloo or the Belle Alliance and two markers G137 and G138 ^{(nl)} ^{(fr)}		Charleroi	rue Petite Aise	50.422764°N 4.466367°E	52011-CLT-0029-01 Info	Porte van Waterloo of de Belle Alliance en twee grenspalen G137 en G138
Prince Forest ^{(nl)} ^{(fr)}		Charleroi		50.376129°N 4.461687°E	52011-CLT-0030-01 Info	
Taille de Hublinbu ^{(nl)} ^{(fr)}		Charleroi		50.373315°N 4.455560°E	52011-CLT-0031-01 Info	
Valley of the river of Fontaine-qui-bout ^{(nl)} ^{(fr)}		Charleroi		50.369088°N 4.442851°E	52011-CLT-0032-01 Info	Vallei van de stroom van Fontaine-qui-Bout
Church of Saint-Paul ^{(nl)} ^{(fr)}		Charleroi		50.390435°N 4.406119°E	52011-CLT-0033-01 Info	Kerk Saint-Paul
Protestant temple ^{(nl)} ^{(fr)}		Charleroi	boulevard Audent n°s 20-22	50.409558°N 4.444962°E	52011-CLT-0034-01 Info	Protestantse tempel
Coalmine Bois du Cazier: porch entrance, fencing, old set (walls and roofs), concierge, building on the left (facades and roofs), except for the studio and shower block, machine building pit 1 (facades, roofs and metal cladding), two chassis with wheels, not the building that they overlap, and environment including the slag heap Saint-Charles ^{(nl)} ^{(fr)}		Charleroi	rue du Cazier	50.381731°N 4.444083°E	52011-CLT-0036-01 Info	Steenkolenmijn van Bois du Cazier: portiek entree, hekwerk, oude stellen (gevels en daken), conciergerie, gebouw links (gevels en daken) uitgezonderd het atelier en douche-blok, machinegebouw van put 1 (gevels, daken en metalen bekleding), twee chassis van wielen, niet het gebouw dat ze overlappen, en omgeving met inbegrip van de terril Saint-Charles
Two towers: facades and roofs ^{(nl)} ^{(fr)}		Charleroi	rue Cardinal Mercier	50.391473°N 4.407247°E	52011-CLT-0039-01 Info	Twee torens: gevels en daken
building (total) ^{(nl)} ^{(fr)}		Charleroi	rue de Turenne n°2	50.411602°N 4.443701°E	52011-CLT-0040-01 Info	gebouw (totaal)
Tumulus Marcinelle and environment ^{(nl)} ^{(fr)}		Charleroi	rue de la Tombe, n°249	50.388262°N 4.427259°E	52011-CLT-0042-01 Info	
Gallery, Passage de la Bourse ^{(nl)} ^{(fr)}		Charleroi		50.407507°N 4.440535°E	52011-CLT-0043-01 Info	Galerie, Passage de la Bourse
House: walls and roofs ^{(nl)} ^{(fr)}		Charleroi	boulevard Solvay n°7	50.415341°N 4.445775°E	52011-CLT-0044-01 Info	Huis: gevels en daken
Former post office: walls and roofs, setting conservation ^{(nl)} ^{(fr)}		Charleroi	place Albert Ier n°23	50.407679°N 4.443099°E	52011-CLT-0047-01 Info	Voormalig postkantoor: gevels en daken, instelling beschermingszone
Old theater "Le Varia": gable roof and front ^{(nl)} ^{(fr)}		Charleroi	rue Lambiotte n°3	50.438315°N 4.436577°E	52011-CLT-0049-01 Info	Oud theater "Le Varia": gevel en voorzijde dak
Completion of the former colliery Appaumée ^{(nl)} ^{(fr)}		Charleroi	rue l'Appaumée, Nos 99 te 113	50.451580°N 4.488856°E	52011-CLT-0051-01 Info	
Doree House: walls, ceilings, dining room (including windows and skylights), hall and living room ^{(nl)} ^{(fr)}		Charleroi	rue Tumelaire n°15	50.411041°N 4.447067°E	52011-CLT-0053-01 Info	Huis Dorée: gevels, daken, eetkamer (inclusief ramen en dakramen), hal en woonkamer
House called "de l'Avocat Dermine": facade and roof ^{(nl)} ^{(fr)}		Charleroi	boulevard Audent n°42	50.409139°N 4.446264°E	52011-CLT-0054-01 Info	Huis genaamd "de l'Avocat Dermine": voorgevel en dak
Facades, roofs and stairs of the building called "The Piano De Heug" ^{(nl)} ^{(fr)}		Charleroi	Quai de Brabant n°5	50.406225°N 4.440083°E	52011-CLT-0055-01 Info	Gevels, daken en trappenhuis van het gebouw genaamd "Piano de Heug"
Art Nouveau house: facade, roofs, stairs, stucco and the staffs of the lobby, woodwork and stained glass windows on the ground floor ^{(nl)} ^{(fr)}		Charleroi	rue Bernus, n°40.	50.415102°N 4.449836°E	52011-CLT-0056-01 Info	Huis Art Nouveau: voorgevel, daken, trappenhuis, stucwerk en de staven van de lobby, houtwerk en glas in lood ramen op de begane grond
Facades and roofs, the wall, the railing, the metal gate and the mechanism of the building called "Brasserie des Allies" ^{(nl)} ^{(fr)}		Charleroi	route de Mons n°38	50.410108°N 4.392122°E	52011-CLT-0057-01 Info	Gevels en daken, de muur, de reling, het metalen hek en het mechanisme van het gebouw genaamd "Brasserie des Alliés"
Head of Centre civique Facade and roof and the house of the head of the school ^{(nl)} ^{(fr)}		Charleroi	rue Massau n°s 2 en 4	50.465152°N 4.428092°E	52011-CLT-0061-01 Info	Hoofdgevel en daken van Centre civique en het huis van het hoofd van de school
Facades and roofs of the house on L. Fagnart n ° s 29 to 31 + elements of the interior. Setting conservation ^{(nl)} ^{(fr)}		Charleroi	L. Fagnart n°s 29-31	50.416070°N 4.445697°E	52011-CLT-0064-01 Info	Gevels en daken van het huis op L. Fagnart n°s 29-31 + bepaalde elementen van het interieur. Instelling beschermingszone
Facades and roofs of the tower of the ancient castle of Gosselies ^{(nl)} ^{(fr)}		Charleroi	place des Martyrs	50.465310°N 4.428667°E	52011-CLT-0066-01 Info	Gevels en daken van de toren van het oude kasteel van Gosselies
Building ^{(nl)} ^{(fr)}		Charleroi	rue de Bomerée 132, Mont-sur-Marchienne	50.373391°N 4.398665°E	52011-CLT-0069-01 Info	Gebouw
Hall (total) ^{(nl)} ^{(fr)}		Charleroi	place Charles II	50.411971°N 4.443724°E	52011-CLT-0070-01 Info	Raadhuis (totaal)
Facades and roofs, the circular lobby, indoor pool typical of the thirties of the building called "Amicale Solvay" ^{(nl)} ^{(fr)}		Charleroi	rue de Châtelet 442, Couillet	50.392437°N 4.477726°E	52011-CLT-0071-01 Info	Gevels en daken, de ronde lobby, het overdekte zwembad typerend voor de jaren dertig van het gebouw genaamd "Amicale Solvay"
Buildings of the Université du Travail Paul Pastur: different parts ^{(nl)} ^{(fr)}		Charleroi		50.416928°N 4.446221°E	52011-CLT-0072-01 Info	Gebouwen van de Université du Travail Paul Pastur: verschillende delen
Organ of the church Saint-Basile ^{(nl)} ^{(fr)}		Charleroi	Couillet	50.391338°N 4.468568°E	52011-CLT-0075-01 Info	Orgel van de kerk Saint-Basile
Building called "Residence Albert", including elements in accordance with the original design of architect Marcel Leborgne held on the date of this decision ^{(nl)} ^{(fr)}		Charleroi	avenue Meurée n°s 97-99, Marcinelle	50.40292°N 4.44452°E	52011-CLT-0076-01 Info	Gebouw genaamd "Résidence Albert", inclusief de elementen in overeenstemming met het oorspronkelijke ontwerp van architect Marcel Leborgne gehouden op de datum van dit besluit
Facades and roofs of residential buildings ^{(nl)} ^{(fr)}		Charleroi	rue Bernus n°s 28 tot 56 en 23 tot 55, Charleroi	50.41545°N 4.45065°E	52011-CLT-0077-01 Info	Gevels en daken van de woongebouwen
Building: walls and roofs ^{(nl)} ^{(fr)}		Charleroi	rue de Turenne n°4	50.411606°N 4.443577°E	52011-CLT-0078-01 Info	
Town hall ^{(nl)} ^{(fr)}		Charleroi		50.411971°N 4.443724°E	52011-PEX-0001-01 Info	Raadhuis

== See also ==
- List of protected heritage sites in Hainaut (province)
- Charleroi
