= Maison Mattot =

Modernist residential building in Charleroi, Belgium

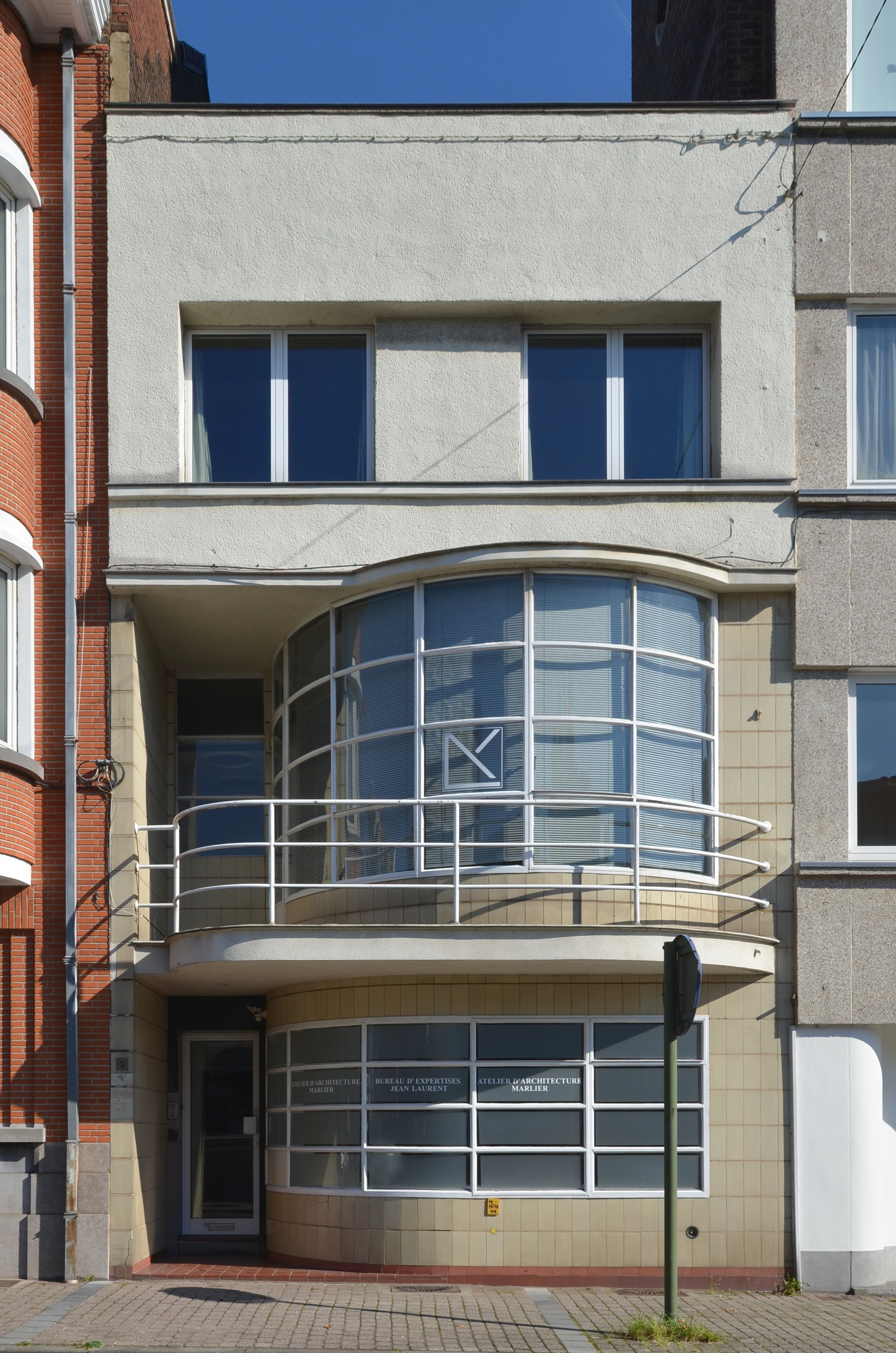
- Main façade facing boulevard Frans Dewandre.
- Interactive map of the Maison Mattot area

General information
- Architectural style: Modern architecture
- Location: Boulevard Frans Dewandre, 3, 6000., Charleroi city, Hainaut Province., Belgium
- Coordinates: 50°24′57″N 04°27′06″E
- Year built: 1937-1939
- Owner: Henri Mattot

Design and construction
- Architect: Marcel Leborgne
- Designations: Former residence and doctor's office. Nowadays an office

The Maison Mattot is a modernist-style residential building on Frans Dewandre Boulevard in Charleroi, Belgium. It was designed in 1937 by architect Marcel Leborgne for the Reine Astrid Maternity Hospital's director, Dr. Mattot. It is a terraced townhouse with a consultation room on the first floor and an apartment on the piano nobile, adapted to the needs of a single person.

The architect also designed the furnishings, of which only the built-in elements have survived.

== History ==
In 1937, architect Marcel Leborgne designed (Note: Plans and photos from the period can be consulted in Bâtir magazine (Flouquet 1939a, p. 106-107) and (Flouquet 1939b, p. 303; 307), online.) a house for Henri Mattot (Note: No article or document relating to the Reine Astrid home or maternity hospital mentions the doctor's first name. However, it is provided in an article published in the Gazette de Charleroi on April 17th, 1936.), gynecologist (Note: In some texts, the house is called Maison du Gynécologue (Pouleur, Bioul and Dauchot 2007, p. 63).) and medical director of the nearby Reine Astrid Maternity Hospital, amid the urbanization of Charleroi's Boulevard Dewandre. It features a long, narrow, chevron-shaped lot whose front and rear façades are clearly separated and staggered. The building is flanked by the Moreau building and is located on the opposite side of the boulevard from the Henry building. Both buildings, as well as the maternity hospital, were designed by the same architect and built at the same time.

In 1955, following a change of ownership, the second floor was enlarged and a terrace was added. The tile frieze at the top of the building was removed.

Other minor alterations were made to adapt the building to office use, especially in the rear section. In 2015, the building was occupied by an architecture firm.

== Architecture ==
In this modernist construction, Marcel Leborgne manages to dominate the particular configuration of the terrain to respond correctly to the specific requirement of "housing for a bachelor gynecologist".

"The volumetry, frequently somewhat elaborate in earlier works, shifts here towards a marked elementarism, while attention to detail is increasingly focused along with the richness of the materials".

The building has three levels.

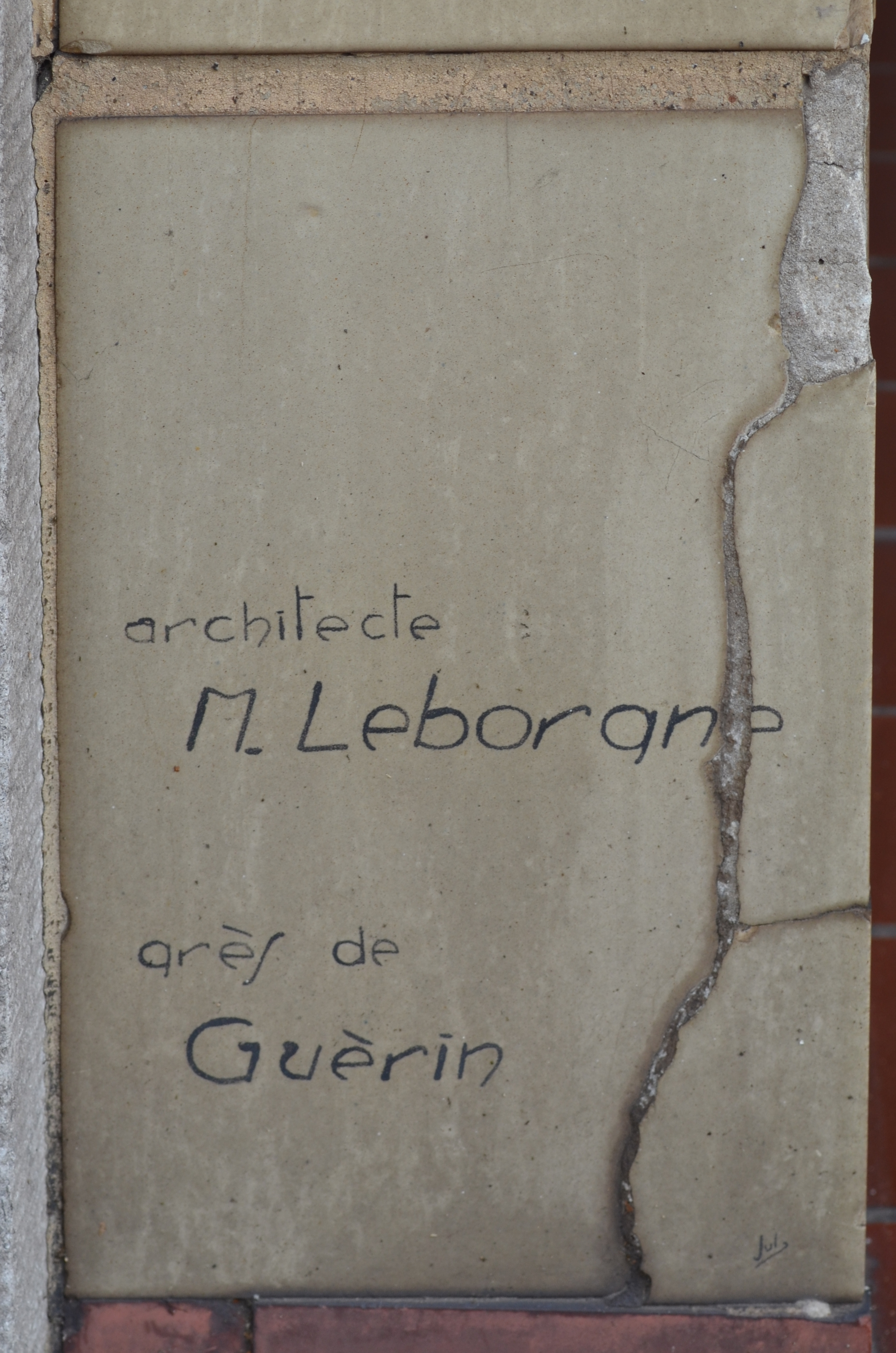
Guérin sandstone plaque with the architect's signature.

On the first floor, spaces are compartmentalized according to function: at the front, towards Dewandre Boulevard, is the doctor's practice and, at the back of it, a waiting room and toilets. The rear part of this level, towards Joseph II Boulevard, is occupied by the garage, the kitchen, and the staircase to the upper level.

On the main façade, a glass roof, illuminating only the practice, gently curves to invite you in. Marcel Leborgne was probably inspired by the Maison Dotremont, built in 1932 in Uccle by Louis Herman De Koninck, which uses the same entrance device.

The second floor is a vast, completely open space, based on the principles of Frank Lloyd Wright, which is perfectly suited to the needs of a single person. Sliding partitions temporarily separate the living room, facing Dewandre Boulevard, from the hygiene and relaxation area. On the façade, the large bay opens slightly onto the boulevard, interacting with the street and the urban landscape. A glass rotunda provides maximum light. The balcony is fitted with a metallic guard rail that resembles a ship's rail. (Note: The term "Streamline Moderne" style is sometimes used for this type of building.)

The top floor features a second apartment, probably intended for guests, and a chambre de bonne. It features two quadrangular windows that follow the rhythm of the neighboring Moreau building.

The first two levels are clad with Guérin sandstone bricks in pierre de France color, adding brightness to the façade.

== Interior design and furniture ==
On the first floor, the design of the consultation room - office, examination room, and dressing room - corresponds to modernist principles, while the play on curves and lines in the stairwell is more in the spirit of Art Deco. The polychromy, which has now disappeared, was described in Bâtir magazine as a mixture of blue and gold leaf, red, Macassar ebony, pale apricot, green and black.

On the second floor, all functions are grouped together in the same space, with only the furniture distinguishing each function. The polychromatic design played on chromatic contrasts, as it did on the first floor.

Marcel Leborgne also designed all the furniture to "guarantee order and prevent unnecessary variations". This furniture has now disappeared, with the exception of the built-in elements, some of which have survived. The furniture was produced by Ateliers d'art De Coene frères (nl) of Kortrijk.

== See also ==
=== Bibliography ===
- ...À Charleroi, Marcel Leborgne, Charleroi, Espace Environnement, 1990, 48 p., p. 27-29.
- Le patrimoine monumental de la Belgique, vol. 20 : Wallonie, Hainaut, Arrondissement de Charleroi, Liège, Pierre Mardaga, éditeur, 1994, 602 p. (ISBN 978-2-87009-588-1, read online archive [PDF]), p. 87.
- Anne-Catherine Bioul, Vivre aujourd'hui dans un intérieur d'autrefois, à Charleroi, Namur, Ministère de la Région Wallonne, coll. "Études et documents / Monuments et sites" (no. 10), 2004, 245 p., p. 214-218.
- Anne-Catherine Bioul, "Marcel Leborgne ou le choix de la modernité "humaine"", Les Cahiers de l'Urbanisme, Wavre, Service public de Wallonie/Éditions Mardaga, no. 73, September 2009, pp. 84-85 (ISBN 978-2-8047-0029-4, read online archive [PDF]).
- Pierre-Louis Flouquet, "Marcel Leborgne, habitation pour un médecin, à Charleroi", Bâtir, no. 76, March 1939, pp. 106-107 (read online archive [PDF]).
- Pierre-Louis Flouquet, "Marcel Leborgne, constructeur lyrique", Bâtir, no. 80, July 1939, pp. 297-329 (read online archive [PDF]).
- Chantal Mengeot and Anne-Catherine Bioul, Le patrimoine de Charleroi : Les fleurs de l'industrie : Art nouveau, Art déco et Modernisme, Namur, Institut du patrimoine wallon, coll. "Carnets du Patrimoine" (no. 128), 2015, 64 p. (ISBN 978-2-87522-148-3).
- Jean-Alexandre Pouleur, Anne-Catherine Bioul and Alain Dauchot, Charleroi, ville d'architectures : Du Temps des Forteresses aux Années Folles 1666-1940, Charleroi, Espace Environnement, 2007, 2nd ed. (1st ed. 1992), 112 p. (ISBN 978-2-930507-00-2).
- Iwan Strauven and Anne Van Loo (eds.), "Leborgne Marcel", in Dictionnaire de l'architecture en Belgique de 1830 à nos jours, Antwerp, Fonds Mercator, 2003, 624 p. (ISBN 978-90-6153-526-3), pp. 390-391.
- Iwan Strauven (ed.), Judith Le Maire (ed.) and Marie-Noëlle Dailly (ed. and photogr.), 1881-2017 Charleroi métropole, Brussels, Mardaga and Cellule architecture de la Fédération Wallonie-Bruxelles, coll. "Guide d'architecture moderne et contemporaine" (no. 4), 2017, 367 p. (ISBN 978-2-8047-0367-7), p. 107.

=== External links ===
- The Mattot house archive in the Marcel Leborgne inventory.
