= De Heug building =

Modernist building in Hainaut, Belgium

- Pianos De Heug
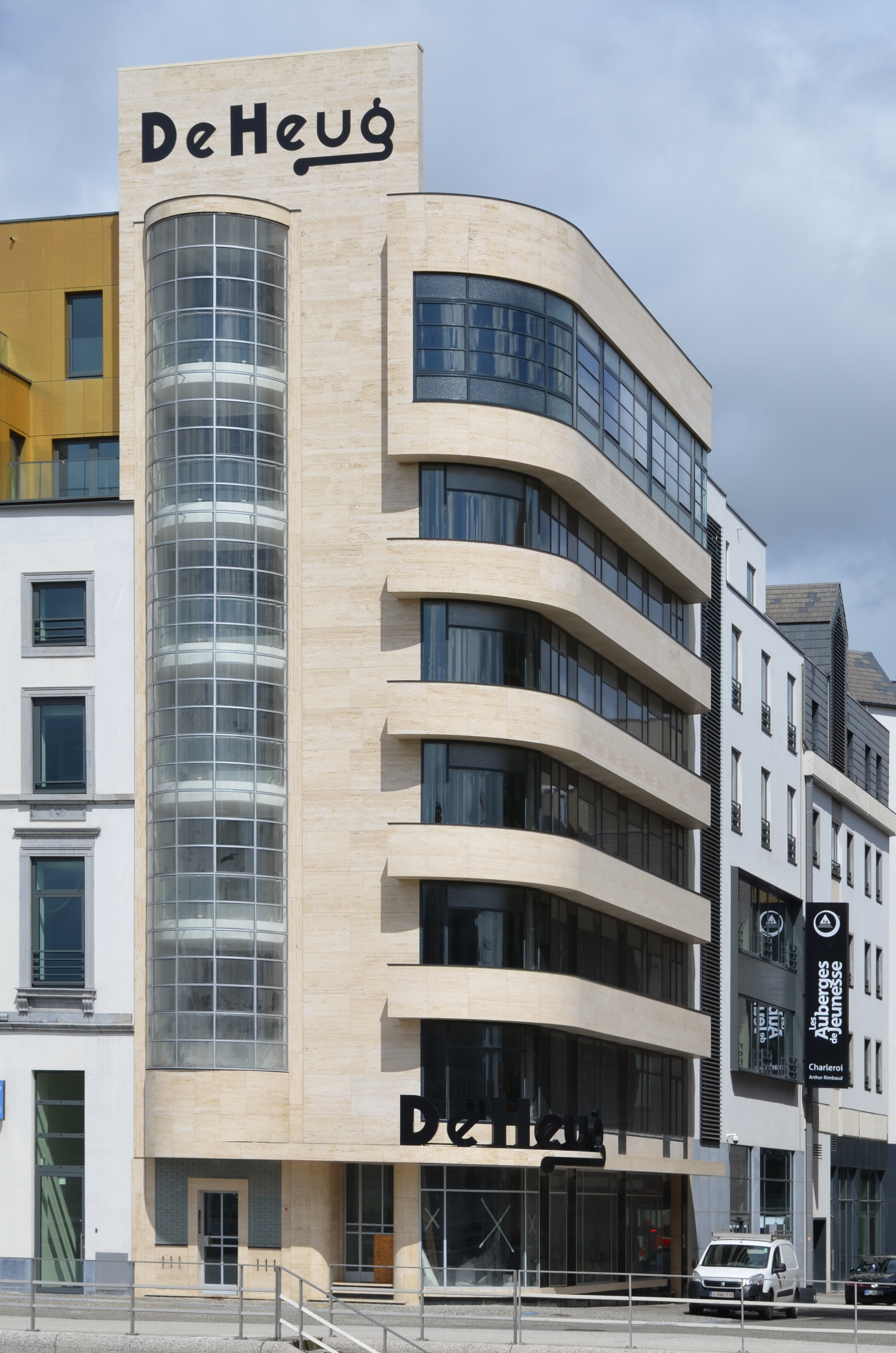
- The building under restoration (April 2019)

- Location within Belgium

General information
- Type: Office
- Architectural style: Modern
- Location: Quai Arthur Rimbaud 5 Charleroi, Hainaut, Belgium
- Coordinates: 50°24′22″N 4°26′24″E
- Year built: 1933-1934
- Renovated: 2015-2020
- Client: De Heug
- Owner: Iret Development

Height
- Height: 19,8m

Technical details
- Floor area: 860 square meter

Design and construction
- Architect: Marcel Leborgne

Other information
- Public transit: Charleroi-Central Metro. Tirou Tram.

The De Heug building, also known as Pianos De Heug and Piano De Heug, is a modernist-style building constructed in 1933 in Charleroi, Belgium, by Marcel Leborgne for piano manufacturer De Heug. At the time, it was used as a salesroom and auditorium. When the company folded, the building was used mainly for housing. After being threatened with demolition, the building was painstakingly restored between 2015 and 2020.

The building makes particular use of curves, which emphasize the vertical aspect - as in the cylindrical stairwell - and the horizontal aspect, as in the rounded corners of the skylight and balconies on each floor.

== History ==
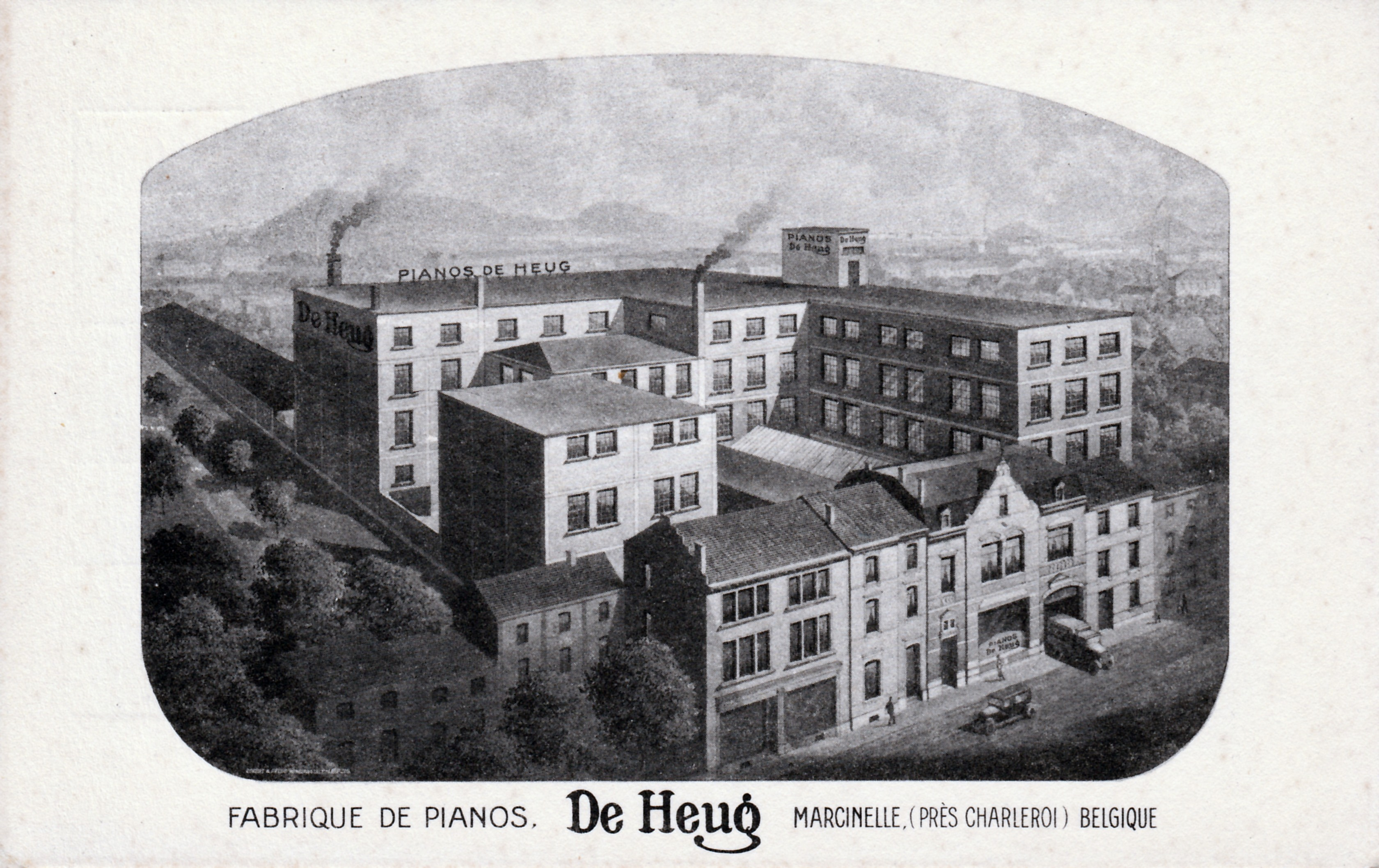
Advertising postcard presenting the De Heug factory in Marcinelle in the 1930s.

"De Heug" was founded in Marcinelle at the end of the 19th century. As a piano manufacturer, it enjoyed international renown and won several awards. The company's greatest prosperity came in the 1920s, when it opened a salesroom in Charleroi's Place Verte. When the founder died in 1932, the company was taken over by his three sons, who decided to build a new salesroom in the same town.

The building, located at the corner of quay Arthur Rimbaud (Note: Former quai de Brabant.) and rue du Bastion d'Egmont, (Note: Former rue du Canal.) on the banks of the Sambre river, was built in 1933-1934 by Marcel Leborgne, probably in collaboration with his brother Henri. (Note: However, the plans preserved in the Charleroi City Archives are signed solely by Marcel Leborgne. (Bioul & Debecker 2004, p. 223, note 48).)

Settled in its new premises, the company soon went into decline, first as a result of the Great Depression of the 1930s, then of World War II, and finally as the piano lost its place in the furnishings of bourgeois homes. One of the three brothers, Paul, continued the business alone. His son Pierre succeeded him in 1958. Following competition from electric instruments, he reconverted to kitchen furniture manufacturing in the 1960s. The company ceased trading in 1981.

Apart from the commercial duplex on the first floor, all the upper floors were used for housing. At this time, the "Pianos De Heug" sign was replaced by "Dolisy", the name of a customs agency, the new occupant of the ground floor.

In 1985, the building was damaged by an attack by Communist Combatant Cells on a branch of the Manufacturers Hanover Corporation, a financial institution then located on the first floor.

The building was listed in 1995 as Wallonia's immovable cultural heritage, and it underwent restoration work at the end of 2002 on the skylight roof of the facade, which had been damaged in a storm.

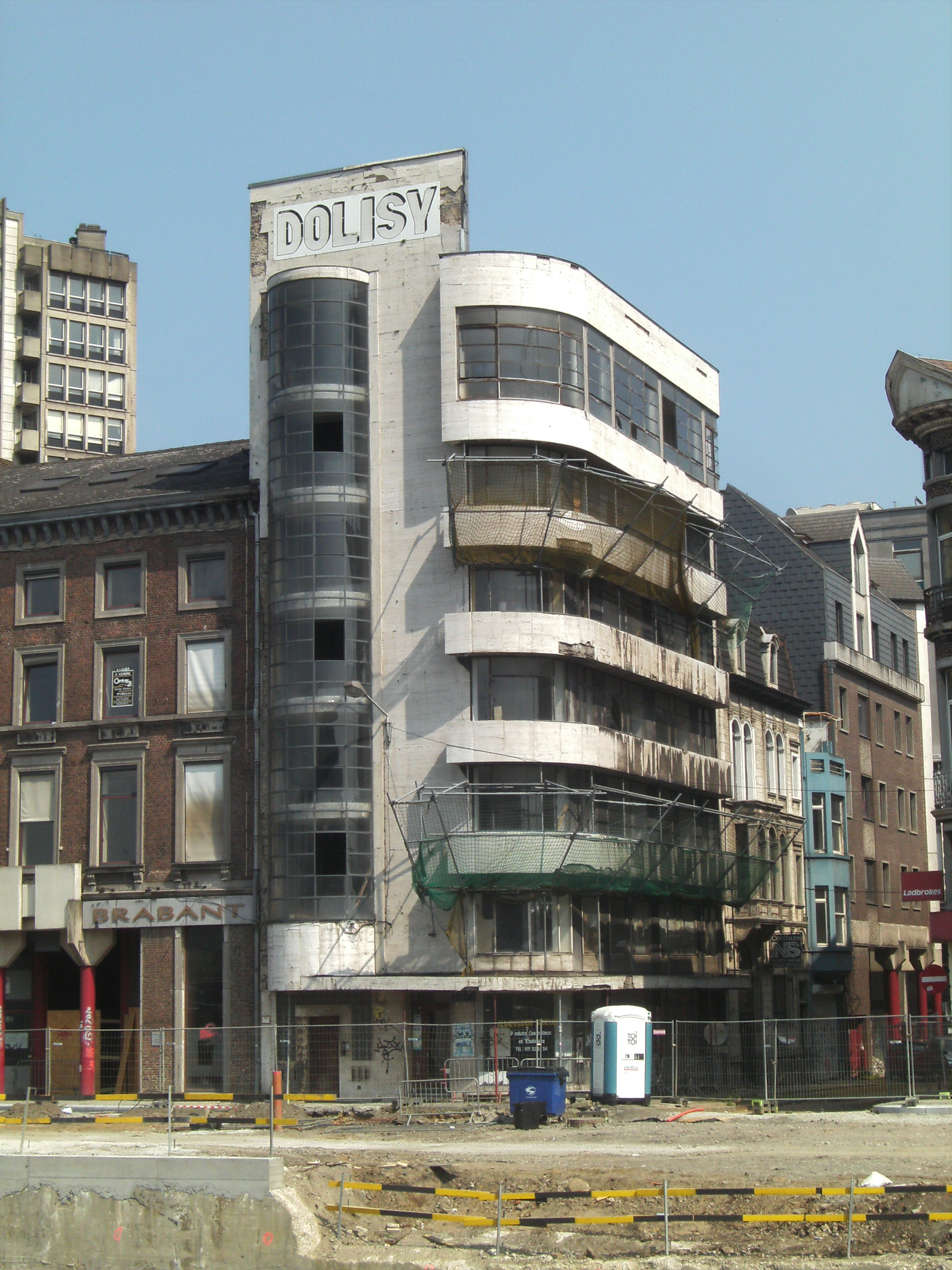
The building in July 2013.

However, the building's outer envelope was deteriorating to the point where shoring and safety nets had to be installed. The owners, notified by the Institut du Patrimoine Walloon in 2006, agreed to restore the façade. (Note: But no restoration was carried out.)

The building was purchased in early 2010 by the limited company Saint-Lambert Promotion/Iret Development as part of a project to create a shopping center called "Rive gauche". The De Heug building was initially intended to become a hostel, (Note: The hostel was finally set up in the building next door and has been accessible since October 1, 2018.) but was eventually dedicated to hosting offices.

By early 2014, its condition had deteriorated to such an extent that the building's survival was in jeopardy. Two expert reports, one commissioned by the owner, the other by the Walloon Region, indicated that restoration would be prohibitively expensive. For a time, reconstruction of the building was even contemplated, retaining only the original stairwell and elevator. (Note: In Wallonia, only four elevators are protected by classification, including three in Charleroi: the one serving the floors of the Gramme building at the Université du Travail Paul Pastur, and those designed by Marcel Leborgne for the Résidence Albert and the De Heug building (Amormino 2019).) This solution was seen by those in favor of protection as a "parody of Leborgne's work". Citizen mobilization supported by architects and historians enabled the building to be saved. In the end, a meticulous restoration solution was chosen.

During the restoration, as many of the existing elements as possible were preserved. The original window frames were renovated and fitted with double glazing. The original technique was reproduced to replace the interior concrete slabs, which had been eaten away by humidity. Access to the terraces was closed off, as the railings were too low for today's safety standards. The original wiring and motor of the listed elevator shaft were also restored. Restoration of the shell was completed in 2018, with the interior fittings scheduled for 2020.

== Architecture ==
The 19.80-meter-high building has seven levels and a flat roof. It is an example of Marcel Leborgne's mastery of curves.

The initial program included a grout floor and mezzanine forming a commercial duplex, three floors of apartments, one floor of studios for piano teachers and the last floor used as an auditorium for piano testing. The building has a total floor area of 860 m^{2}, including a 112 m^{2} ground floor with an 85 m^{2} mezzanine, five 120 m^{2} floors and a 130 m^{2} sixth floor.

The building was constructed in concrete with a travertine marble cladding. During construction, the travertine slabs for the balconies were placed prior to concreting. Held in place by lighter formwork, they served as formwork incorporated into the mass. On the facade, the slabs are fixed with cement blocks and copper wire.

The interior layout required a stairwell projecting outwards. In August 1933, the architect requested a 1.75-metre (Note: Marcel Leborgne's request stated: "Considering that no other building will ever be erected opposite this one, and that the setback is immense and the projection transparent, since it will be built in steel and glass, it will in no way detract from the aesthetics of the street; and since this building will be erected using modern technology, it can only increase the interest of the entrance to the town by constructing a building that will certainly be worthy of note, especially as this glass column will be constantly lit at night". (Mengeot & Bioul 2015, p. 52).) overhang from the Collège des bourgmestre et échevins. On a special basis, the Collège tolerated a maximum overhang of 1.50 metres, provided that the clear height over the sidewalk be 3 metres. This glass and steel column, both aesthetic and functional, emphasized the vertical aspect of the quayside.

The facade on the adjacent street was predominantly horizontal, accentuated by the alternating light travertine surfaces on the balcony exteriors and the dark appearance of the windows, accentuated by the use of black Mazy marble on the trumeaux. The corner situation called for maximum light from this side. Skylights were designed for this purpose in the main rooms of the apartments.

According to Anne-Catherie Bioul and Chantal Mengeot, the building is reminiscent of the industrial aesthetics advocated by the Bauhaus movement, characterized by simplicity and rationality. Maurice Culot, on the other hand, believes that the building is "in line with the best achievements of Italian rationalism".

== See also ==
- List of protected heritage sites in Charleroi

== Bibliography ==
- Mardaga, Pierre, ed. (1994). Le patrimoine monumental de la Belgique (in French). Vol. 20: Wallonie, Hainaut, Arrondissement de Charleroi. ISBN 2-87009-588-0.
- Amormino, Vanessa (2019). Institut du Patrimoine (ed.). "Les ascenseurs anciens, un patrimoine à préserver" (PDF). La Lettre du Patrimoine (in French) (54): 4.
- Bioul, Anne-Catherine; Debecker, Anne (2004). Ministère de la Région wallonne (ed.). Vivre aujourd'hui dans un intérieur d'autrefois, à Charleroi (in French). ISBN 2-87401-171-1.
- Bioul, Anne-Catherine (2009) [September, 2009]. "Marcel Leborgne ou le choix de la modernité "humaine"". Les Cahiers de l'Urbanisme (in French) (73): 81–85. ISBN 978-2-8047-0029-4.
- Bioul, Anne-Catherine (2011). Association des Amis de l'Unesco (ed.). "Ode au béton et à la lumière: Leborgne et l'immeuble paquebot". Les Nouvelles du patrimoine (in French) (132: Béton et patrimoine): 30–33. ISBN 978-2-8047-0029-4. ISSN 0773-9796.
- Culot, Maurice; Warzée, Gaëtane (1999). "L'œuvre de Marcel Leborgne". In Division du Patrimoine, DGATLP (ed.). Le patrimoine moderne et contemporain de Wallonie: De 1792 à 1958 (in French). pp. 114–116. ISBN 2-87401-070-7.
- Flouquet, Pierre Louis (1934) [June, 1934]. "Les frères Leborgne" (PDF). Bâtir (20): 778–781.
- Mengeot, Chantal; Bioul, Anne-Catherine (2015). Institut du patrimoine (ed.). Le patrimoine de Charleroi: Les fleurs de l'industrie : Art nouveau, Art déco et Modernisme (in French). ISBN 978-2-87522-148-3.
- Strauven, Ivan; Van Loo, Anne (2003). "Leborgne Marcel". In Fonds Mercator (ed.). Dictionnaire de l'architecture en Belgique de 1830 à nos jours (in French). pp. 390–391.
- Strauven, Iwan; Le Maire, Judith; Dailly, Marie-Noëlle (2017). Mardaga editions and Cellule architecture de la Fédération Wallonie-Bruxelles (ed.). 1881-2017 Charleroi métropole (in French). ISBN 978-2-8047-0367-7.
- Wintgens, Véronique; Haine, Malou; Meeùs, Nicolas (1986). "De Heug". In Mardaga, Pierre (ed.). Dictionnaire des facteurs d'instruments de musique en Wallonie et à Bruxelles du 9 siècle à nos jours (in French). pp. 112–113. ISBN 2-87009-250-4.
