= List of protected heritage sites in Durbuy =

This table shows an overview of the protected heritage sites in the Walloon town Durbuy. This list is part of Belgium's national heritage.

Object	Year/architect	Town/section	Address	Coordinates	Number^{?}	Image
The Grain Exchange or Spanish house ^{(nl)} ^{(fr)}		Durbuy	Durbuy	50.352104°N 5.456216°E	83012-CLT-0001-01 Info	De graanbeurs of Spaans huis
The century-old beech tree at a place called "Haie des Veaux" ^{(nl)} ^{(fr)}		Durbuy	Durbuy	50.346340°N 5.446606°E	83012-CLT-0002-01 Info	
The facades and roofs of buildings (vicarage) ^{(nl)} ^{(fr)}		Durbuy	rue des Récollets n°38, Durbuy	50.352912°N 5.456711°E	83012-CLT-0003-01 Info	
The facades and roofs of the castle of Bomal ^{(nl)} ^{(fr)}		Durbuy	Durbuy	50.376262°N 5.521730°E	83012-CLT-0005-01 Info	
Notre Dame ^{(nl)} ^{(fr)}		Durbuy	Borlon	50.379222°N 5.404748°E	83012-CLT-0007-01 Info	Kerk Notre-Dame
Wall around the cemetery of the church of Notre-Dame ^{(nl)} ^{(fr)}		Durbuy	Durbuy	50.379136°N 5.404845°E	83012-CLT-0008-01 Info	
The old tower, called Justice annexed to the castle of Grandhan ^{(nl)} ^{(fr)}		Durbuy	Grandhan	50.329732°N 5.408607°E	83012-CLT-0010-01 Info	De oude toren, genaamd Justitie, gehecht aan het kasteel van Grandhan
Church of Sainte-Marguerite and the wall of the cemetery of Adrienne Illes, and the ensemble of the church, cemetery and surrounding wall ^{(nl)} ^{(fr)}		Durbuy	Granhan	50.317078°N 5.378623°E	83012-CLT-0011-01 Info	Kerk Sainte-Marguerite en de muur van het kerkhof van Enneilles, en het ensemble van de kerk, kerkhof en omgeving
Two lime trees in the locality "Chêne-à-Han", at the intersection of the road and that of Somme-Leuze Enneille-Lamarteau ^{(nl)} ^{(fr)}		Durbuy	Grandhan	50.331732°N 5.390026°E	83012-CLT-0012-01 Info	
Tower, the walls and roofs of the main building of the castle of Izier, and the ensemble of the tower, main building, the farmhouse and courtyard, and the plot next to the gate of the buildings ^{(nl)} ^{(fr)}		Durbuy		50.383462°N 5.580395°E	83012-CLT-0013-01 Info	Toren, de muren en daken van het hoofdgebouw van de kasteelhoeve van Izier, en het ensemble van de toren, het hoofdgebouw, de boerderij en de binnenplaats, en het perceel naast de poort van de gebouwen
St. Martin's Church ^{(nl)} ^{(fr)}		Durbuy	Tohogne	50.380183°N 5.480436°E	83012-CLT-0014-01 Info	Kerk Saint-Martin
Chapel (unused) ^{(nl)} ^{(fr)}		Durbuy	place Vendôme, rechts van n°44	50.401702°N 5.512135°E	83012-CLT-0015-01 Info	
Building in Tohogne ^{(nl)} ^{(fr)}		Durbuy	rue de Presseux	50.381271°N 5.479585°E	83012-CLT-0017-01 Info	
Church Sainte Walburge ^{(nl)} ^{(fr)}		Durbuy	Wéris	50.326551°N 5.530436°E	83012-CLT-0018-01 Info	Kerk Sainte Walburge
Dolmens in the territory of the village Wéris ^{(nl)} ^{(fr)}		Durbuy	Wéris	50.333377°N 5.522700°E	83012-CLT-0019-01 Info	Dolmens op het grondgebied van het dorp Wéris
Ensemble of the church and the fortified house of Wéris ^{(nl)} ^{(fr)}		Durbuy	Wéris	50.326428°N 5.529827°E	83012-CLT-0020-01 Info	
Oldest parts of the city walls ^{(nl)} ^{(fr)}		Durbuy	Durbuy	50.352040°N 5.457713°E	83012-CLT-0022-01 Info	
The facades and roofs of the house Legros ^{(nl)} ^{(fr)}		Durbuy	Durbuy	50.350941°N 5.493804°E	83012-CLT-0023-01 Info	De gevels en daken van het huis Legros
The facades and roofs of the chapel in M. Paridaens, and the panels in the interior of the building, and the ensemble of the chapel and its surroundings ^{(nl)} ^{(fr)}		Durbuy	Durbuy	50.419313°N 5.414682°E	83012-CLT-0024-01 Info	
Chapel of Saint-Denis ^{(nl)} ^{(fr)}		Durbuy	Juzaine	50.370250°N 5.534069°E	83012-CLT-0026-01 Info	Kapel Saint-Denis
The facades and roofs of the building "La Poivrière" ^{(nl)} ^{(fr)}		Durbuy	Grand-Rue n°28, Durbuy	50.350667°N 5.494417°E	83012-CLT-0027-01 Info	De gevels en daken van het gebouw "La Poivrière"
Old Manse: facades and roofs ^{(nl)} ^{(fr)}		Durbuy	rue de Liège, links van n°29	50.379125°N 5.523317°E	83012-CLT-0028-01 Info	
Mont Saint Rahy ^{(nl)} ^{(fr)}		Durbuy	Bomal	50.384403°N 5.541104°E	83012-CLT-0029-01 Info	
The "Grandes Roches" ^{(nl)} ^{(fr)}		Durbuy	Bomal	50.377741°N 5.528943°E	83012-CLT-0030-01 Info	
Ensemble of the chapel of Sainte-Geneviève, the linden trees and grassland around them ^{(nl)} ^{(fr)}		Durbuy	Izier	50.382415°N 5.587560°E	83012-CLT-0031-01 Info	
The "Longue Haye", including the country road called "Voye du Juzaine" and the two towns called "Calvary" and "Longue Haye" ^{(nl)} ^{(fr)}		Durbuy	Ozo	50.368501°N 5.538140°E	83012-CLT-0035-01 Info	
The facades and roofs of the building (Institut Clairval) ^{(nl)} ^{(fr)}		Durbuy	rue des Récollets n°39, Durbuy	50.353131°N 5.457000°E	83012-CLT-0036-01 Info	
Old Grain Exchange ^{(nl)} ^{(fr)}		Durbuy		50.352104°N 5.456216°E	83012-PEX-0001-01 Info	
Murals from the 16th and 17th centuries of the church of Saint-Martin ^{(nl)} ^{(fr)}		Durbuy	Tohogne	50.380183°N 5.480436°E	83012-PEX-0002-01 Info	
The northern Dolmen ^{(nl)} ^{(fr)}		Durbuy	Wéris	50.333377°N 5.522700°E	83012-PEX-0003-01 Info	

== See also ==
- List of protected heritage sites in Luxembourg (Belgium)
- Durbuy
