= Chambre de bonne =

Residence most commonly found in France

A chambre de bonne (literally, "maid's room"), is a type of French apartment consisting of a single room in a middle-class house or apartment building. It is generally found on the top floor and only accessible by a staircase, sometimes a separate "service staircase". Initially, these rooms were intended as the bedroom for one of the family's domestics, and the name originates from the colloquial name for such maids: a "bonne à tout faire" (literally, "maid of all work"). Today, chambres de bonne are usually the cheapest rung on the Parisian letting market, and are primarily rented by low-income workers and students. They are also in high demand among workers who wish to maintain a small room or postal address in a big city, especially Paris.

Due to the social level of the envisaged occupants, chambres de bonne are characterised by their tight proportions. The rooms usually have a floor area of around 6–12 m^{2} (65–129 sq ft), which is sometimes diminished by being located in a garret with sloping ceilings. They tend to offer minimal facilities: toilets are usually shared with the neighbouring rooms, and located on the landing.

Chambres de bonne have nevertheless been the object of legislation to preserve their occupants' quality of life and health. In the twentieth century, the French government stipulated that all rental properties must have a minimum floor area of 9 m^{2} (97 sq ft), a volume of 20 m^{3} (710 cu ft), and openings (windows, doors, etc.) equivalent to an eighth of the surface area.

In recent years, landlords have attempted to rebrand their chambres de bonne by advertising them as studettes, a hitherto-unknown category of housing for smaller studios (broadly, those of 12 m^{2} (130 sq ft) or less). Since most listings agencies do not recognise a firm distinction between "studios" and "studettes", chambres de bonne may also simply be advertised as studios. Parisian apartment-hunters are, nevertheless, often able to infer that a studio is a chambre de bonne from its listing, due to the distinctive features described above.

== Alternatives ==
A 1993 guidebook for young people wishing to live and work in Paris, gave the following advice about accommodation in the city: "Accommodation in Paris is hard to find. The main types are, chambre de bonne (maid's room), studio/studette (one room flat), flat (two or more rooms), hostels/foyers, hotels, or a room with a family."

== See also ==
- List of house types
- Loi Carrez
- Studio apartment
- The L-Shaped Room (novel)
- Single room occupancy
- Bedsit
- Maison Mattot
