= Institut du Patrimoine =

Walloon government agency

Emblem of the Hague Convention of 1954 with text "Monument protégé", used to mark protected buildings and other structures.

The Institut du Patrimoine wallon (IPW) was the official public Wallonian institute created by law to protect and spread awareness of Belgian cultural heritage, specifically in Wallonia.

Since January 1, 2018, the "Institut du Patrimoine wallon" (IPW) has been absorbed by the Walloon Heritage Agency Agence Wallonne du Patrimoine (AwaP). This Walloon Heritage Agency "Agence Wallonne du Patrimoine" (AwaP) is the result of the merger of two institutional bodies: the Walloon Heritage Institute "Institut du Patrimoine wallon"(IPW) and the Heritage department of the Walloon Public Service (SPW). Since 2018 the management of real estate assets in Wallonia has been carried out by Walloon Heritage Agency (AwaP), part of the Wallonia Public Service (SPW) department Spatial and Urban Planning (DGO4).

AWaP's missions combine the missions of its two parent entities: managing archaeological sites, inventorying, studying and preserving monuments and remarkable properties, promoting heritage, training in heritage professions, supporting the owners of classified properties, granting subsidies, etc.

== See also ==
- Beschermd erfgoed, the term for the National Heritage Sites of Flanders
- Culture of Belgium
- St. Lambert's Cathedral, Liège, destroyed by the French in the 1790s
