= Ship's rail =

Barrier around the deck of a ship

The ship's rail refers to the parapet around the deck of a ship or vessel. It is sometimes erroneously used to refer to the bulwark or the guardrail of boats and ships.

== Description ==
On sailed ships, the ship's rail is a wooden or iron wall around the upper deck topped by compartmentalized caisson where crew hammocks are placed, the latter covered by a canvas for protection from the elements and humidity.

By extension, this term may also refer to a ship's guard rails and gunnels.

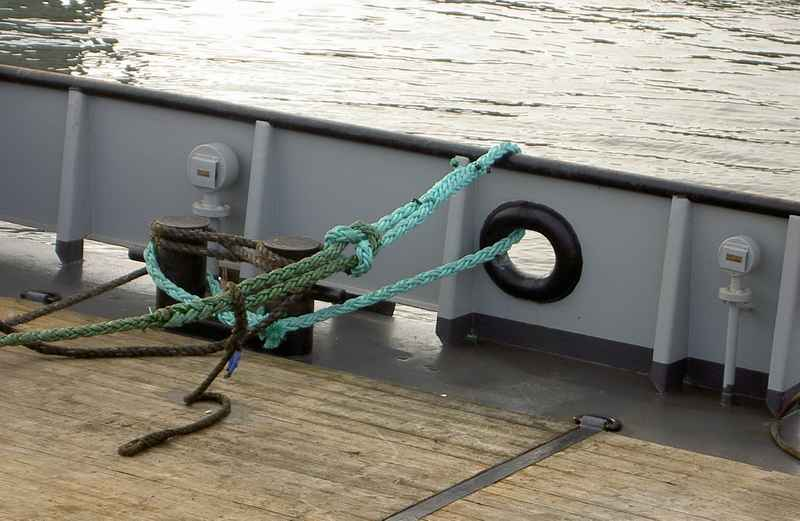
Ship's rail of a tugboat at Cuxhaven.

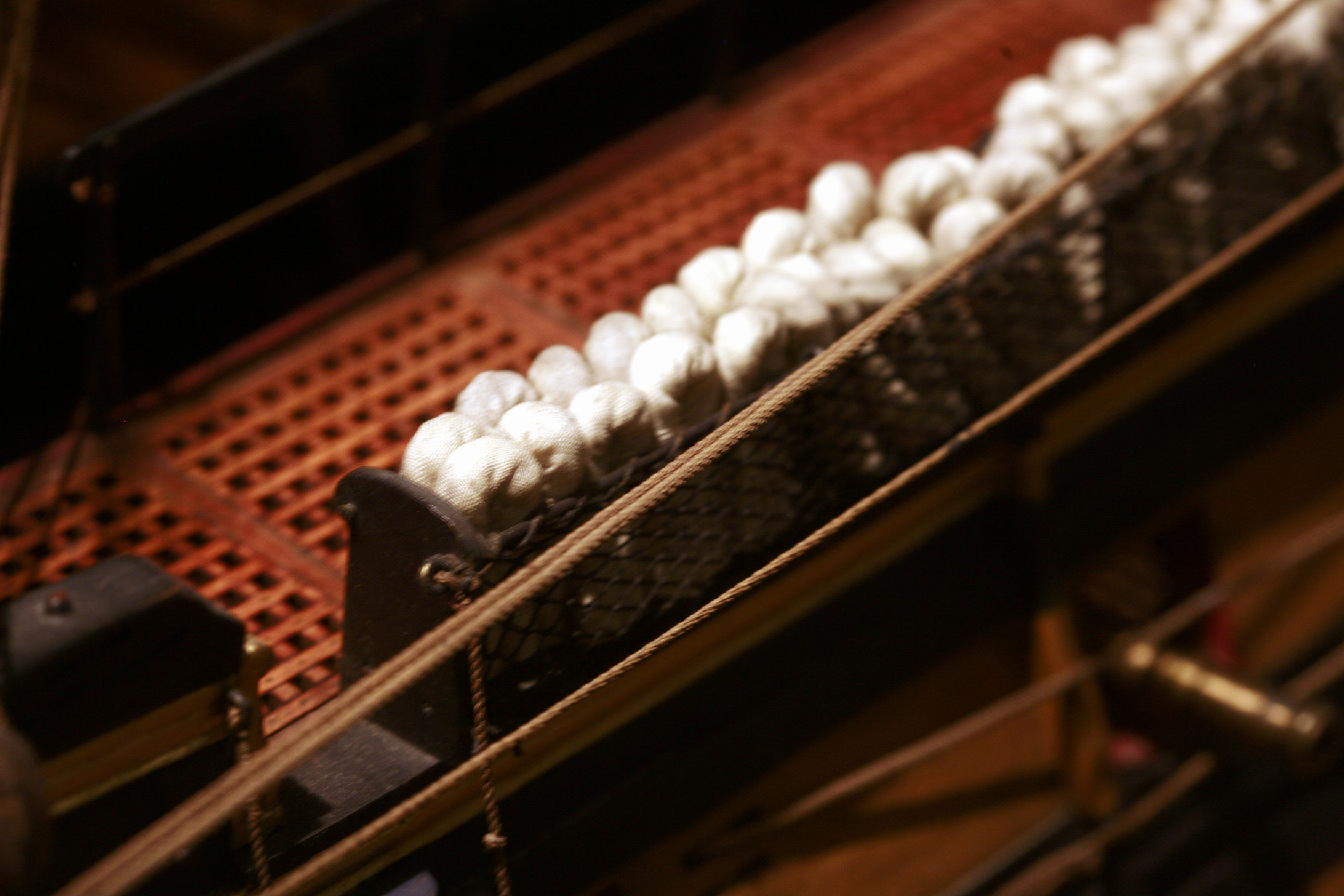
Hammocks in combat position on a scale model of the Protecteur, displayed at the Musée de la Marine de Paris.
