= Beschermd erfgoed =

Flemish heritage protection

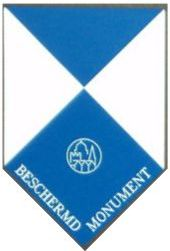
Emblem of the Hague Convention of 1954 with text "Beschermd Monument", used to mark protected buildings and other structures.

Beschermd erfgoed is the official term to describe Flemish National Heritage Sites listed by law to protect and spread awareness of Belgian cultural heritage, specifically in Flanders. The term is also used nationwide to refer to national heritage sites. Because Belgium is officially a tri-lingual country, the other nationwide terms used in the rest of the country are the French term Bien classé and the German term Kulturdenkmal.

Various websites with public information are maintained, and various initiatives are undertaken to assist protected property owners and to increase public awareness, most notably the European Heritage Days, which are called Open Monumentendagen in Dutch, Journées du patrimoine in French, and Tag des offenen Denkmals in German, depending on the language of the locale.

In Flanders, the government agencies "Ruimte en Erfgoed" and "Vlaams Instituut voor het Onroerend Erfgoed (VIOE)" joined in 2011 to form Flemish organization for Immovable Heritage. They work as agencies of the Flemish Ministry of Spatial Planning, Housing Policy and Heritage sites (Dutch: Ministerie van Ruimtelijke Ordening, Woonbeleid en Onroerend Erfgoed (RWO)) from four locations in Antwerp, Leuven, Hasselt and Ghent. They maintain the administration of the Royal Commission for Monuments and Sites (Dutch: Koninklijke Commissie voor Monumenten en Landschappen (KCML)).

== See also ==
- Culture of Belgium
- Institut du Patrimoine, institute in charge of the National Heritage Sites of Wallonia
- National Heritage Site (Belgium)
