= Marcel Leborgne =

Belgian modernist architect

- Born: 15 April 1898; Gilly
- Died: 22 January 1978 (aged 79); Charleroi
- Alma mater: St Luc Institute of fine Arts
- Occupation: Architect
- Works: Cité de l'Enfance, Résidence Albert, Villa Dirickz, De Heug building
- Website: www.marcelleborgne.be

Marcel Leborgne (15 April 1898 – 22 January 1978) was a Belgian architect. His work is essentially modernist. His career is concentrated in the Charleroi region at the height of the modernism movement in Belgium.

== Biography ==
Born in Gilly, Marcel Leborgne studied at the Jesuit College in Charleroi and then studied architecture at the Saint-Luc Institute of fine Arts, first in Tournai and later in Brussels. He graduated in 1922.

He started working with his brother Henri, mainly on the reconstruction of Wijtschate, from 1921 to 1926, a town near Ypres destroyed during the First World War. There he came into contact with modernist ideas, particularly those of Victor Bourgeois, and the majority of his work was built by the architect. Most of his work was built between the two world wars. They are mainly villas, apartment buildings and public service buildings.

In 1947, he suffered a thrombosis that partially paralyzed him. He then devoted himself more to urban planning and painting. He delegated to his collaborators and his architectural projects became rare until his death in 1978.

== Works ==
In addition to Victor Bourgeois, Marcel Leborgne was also influenced by great masters such as Le Corbusier, Robert Mallet-Stevens, the De Stijl movement and even Frank Lloyd Wright in the villa he built for himself in Loverval in 1929.

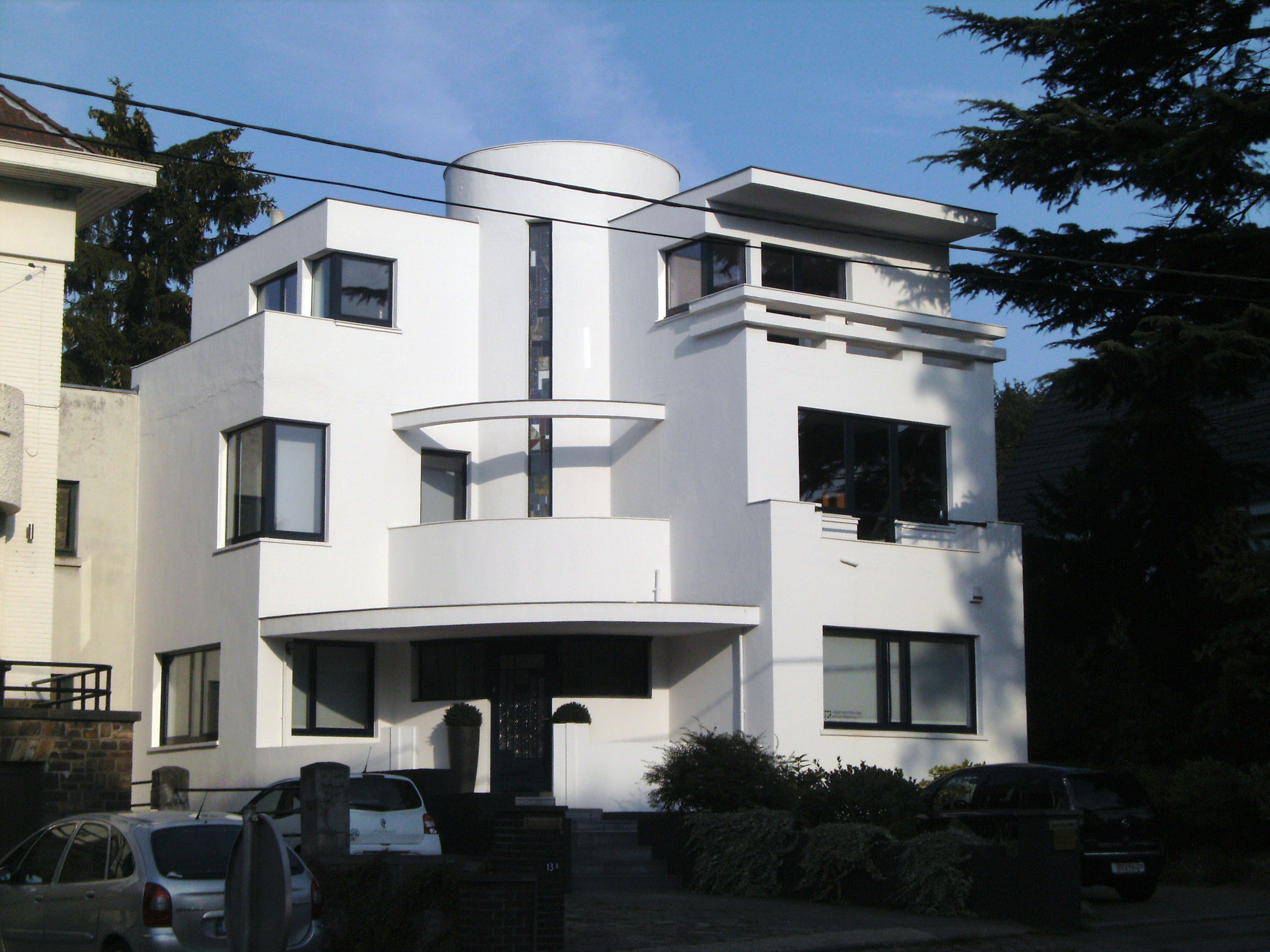
Villa Genval (Loverval)

It was in Charleroi that he concentrated his efforts and where his most famous work is to be found. He is inextricably linked to the heritage of Charleroi, where several of his buildings are listed. Leborgne built in 1930 in Loverval a private house presenting a great artistic proximity to Robert Mallet-Stevens and the Hotel Martel in Paris.

Interested in the new social programmes aimed at improving the lot of the underprivileged, he built the Reine Astrid maternity hospital in Charleroi (1936–1937) and the Cité de l'Enfance in Marcinelle, an orphanage conceived as a garden city.He built and supported the construction of collective housing like the Albert residence on avenue Meurée in Marcinelle (1937–1938), the Moreau building on boulevard Dewandre in Charleroi (1938) and the Moulin residence on boulevard Tirou in Charleroi (1948). With Joseph André, he realized the urbanization of the boulevard Joseph Tirou in Charleroi. The quality of this project allowed him to be appointed in 1951 to the Technical Council of Urbanism in Brussels.

Although he was also active outside his home town, notably in Mariembourg (Villa Malter, 1933), Namur (Villa Liber), Brussels (Villa Lemort, 1934), Saint-Idesbald (Villa Le Carbet, 1937) and Rhode-Saint-Genèse, where he built his most spectacular work in collaboration with his brother, the Villa Dirickz (1933).

"He created a simple, real and functional architecture. Only the forms counted for him and any useless or superfluous decoration was radically proscribed" wrote one of his colleagues, Édouard Bouillart. His vision of a functionalism without dryness, more sentimental and refined, adapting to the needs of the client, sometimes earned him criticism, but above all, the title of "lyrical builder".

== Notable works ==
After a period of oblivion, the demolition of the Reine Astrid maternity hospital, dear to the hearts of the inhabitants of Charleroi, in the 1980s under Mayor Jean-Claude Van Cauwenberghe, marked the beginning of a renewed interest in the work of Marcel Leborgne.

As of 2023, five of Marcel Leborgne's buildings are listed as heritage sites.

=== Villa Dirickz ===
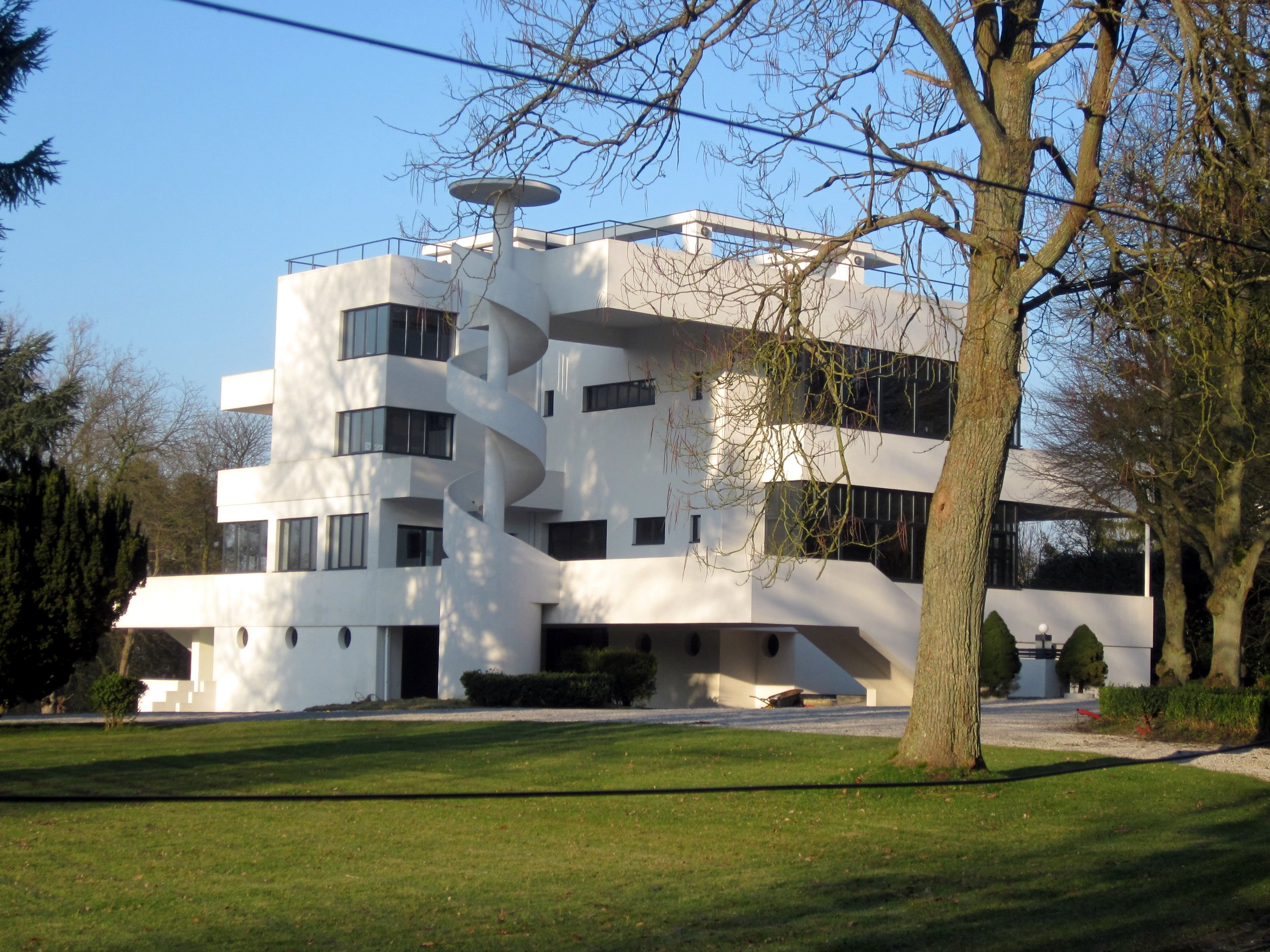
Villa Dirickx (Rhode-Saint-Genèse)

Built in 1929–1933 in collaboration with his brother Henri, the Villa Dirickz is considered the most important work of Marcel Leborgne. It was built for Henri Dirickz (sometimes spelled Dirickx), general manager of the steelmaking company "Forges de Clabecq".

The villa is inscribed in a virtual cube of 25 meters on each side. It has two ambivalent sides. On the street side, its horizontal windows are clearly in the spirit of Le Corbusier. On the garden side, the symmetrical façade is inspired by Art Deco. The atrium is centered around a basin which gives a theatrical aspect to the whole. It seems to have been inspired by the décor designed by Robert Mallet-Stevens for the film L'Inhumaine by Marcel L'Herbier. The villa was also used as a set for the film The Teddy Bear, directed by Jacques Deray and starring Alain Delon. Belgian cartoonist Goffin and scenarists François Schuiten and Benoît Peeters used it in their comic strip, Plagiat!.

It remained the property of the master builder's family until the 1980s. The building became a listed heritage building in 1990. Nevertheless, the villa deteriorated quickly but was bought at the end of 2007 by Alexander Cambron who restored it and modernized it.

=== De Heug building ===
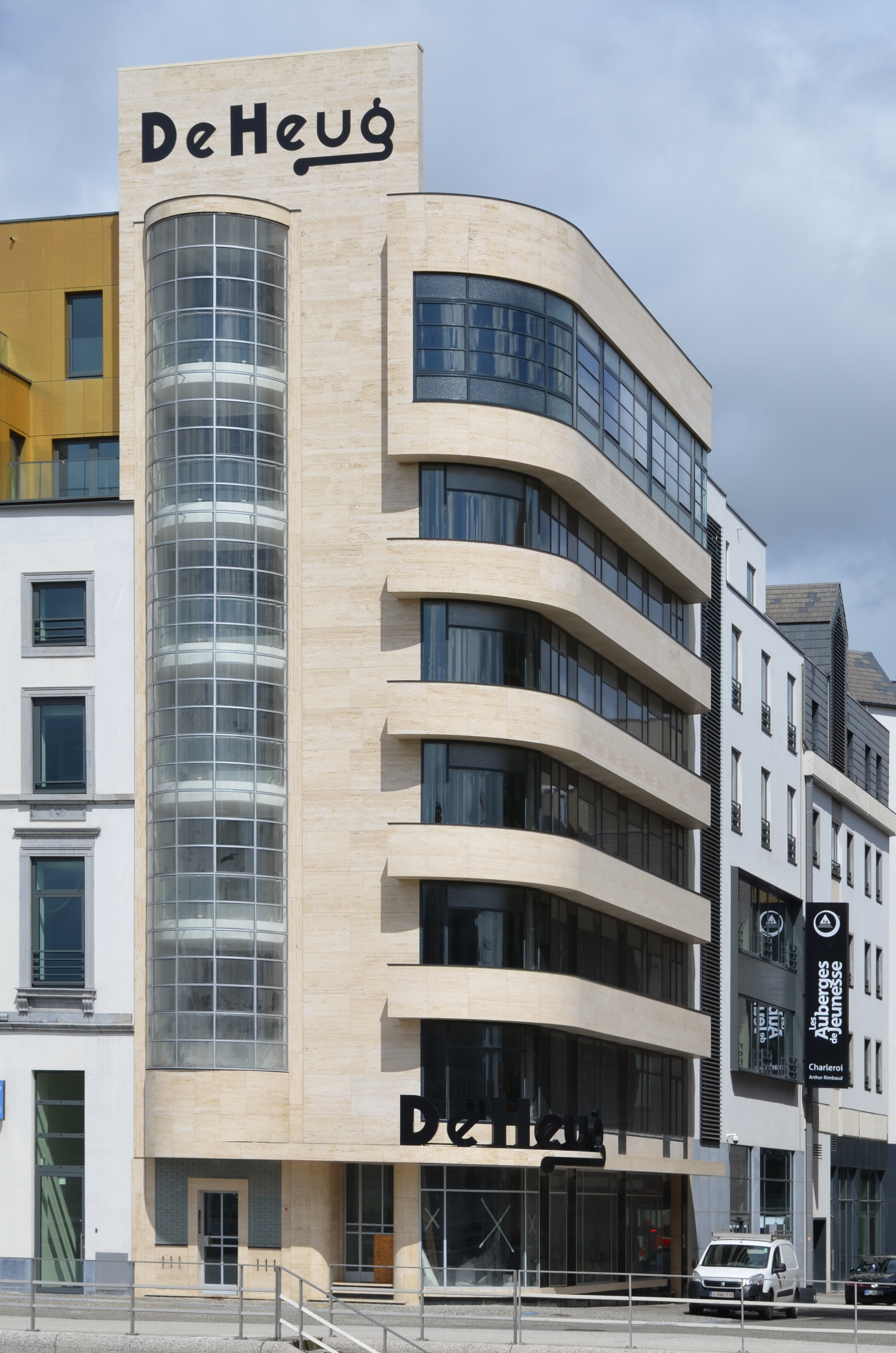
Building Pianos De Heug (Charleroi)

The building called "Pianos De Heug" was built in 1933, probably in collaboration with his brother Henri. The building is almost 20 meters high and has seven levels. It makes particular use of curves that emphasize the vertical aspect – as in the case of the glass rotunda of the stairwell – and horizontal for the rounded corner of the glass roof and the balcony on each floor. These skylights, placed on the side of the adjacent street, bring sufficient light into the apartments.

The building is made of concrete with travertine marble cladding. During construction, the travertine slabs were placed before pouring concrete. Maintained by lighter formwork, they themselves served as formwork incorporated into the mass.

The original program called for a first floor and mezzanine floor forming a commercial duplex, three floors of apartments, one floor of studios for piano teachers, and the last floor served as an auditorium for testing pianos.

The building became a listed heritage building in 1995. Nevertheless, by early 2014, after ten years of vacancy, its condition had deteriorated terribly to the point that the building's survival was in jeopardy. After being threatened with demolition, the building was painstakingly restored between 2015 and 2020.

=== Villa Darville ===
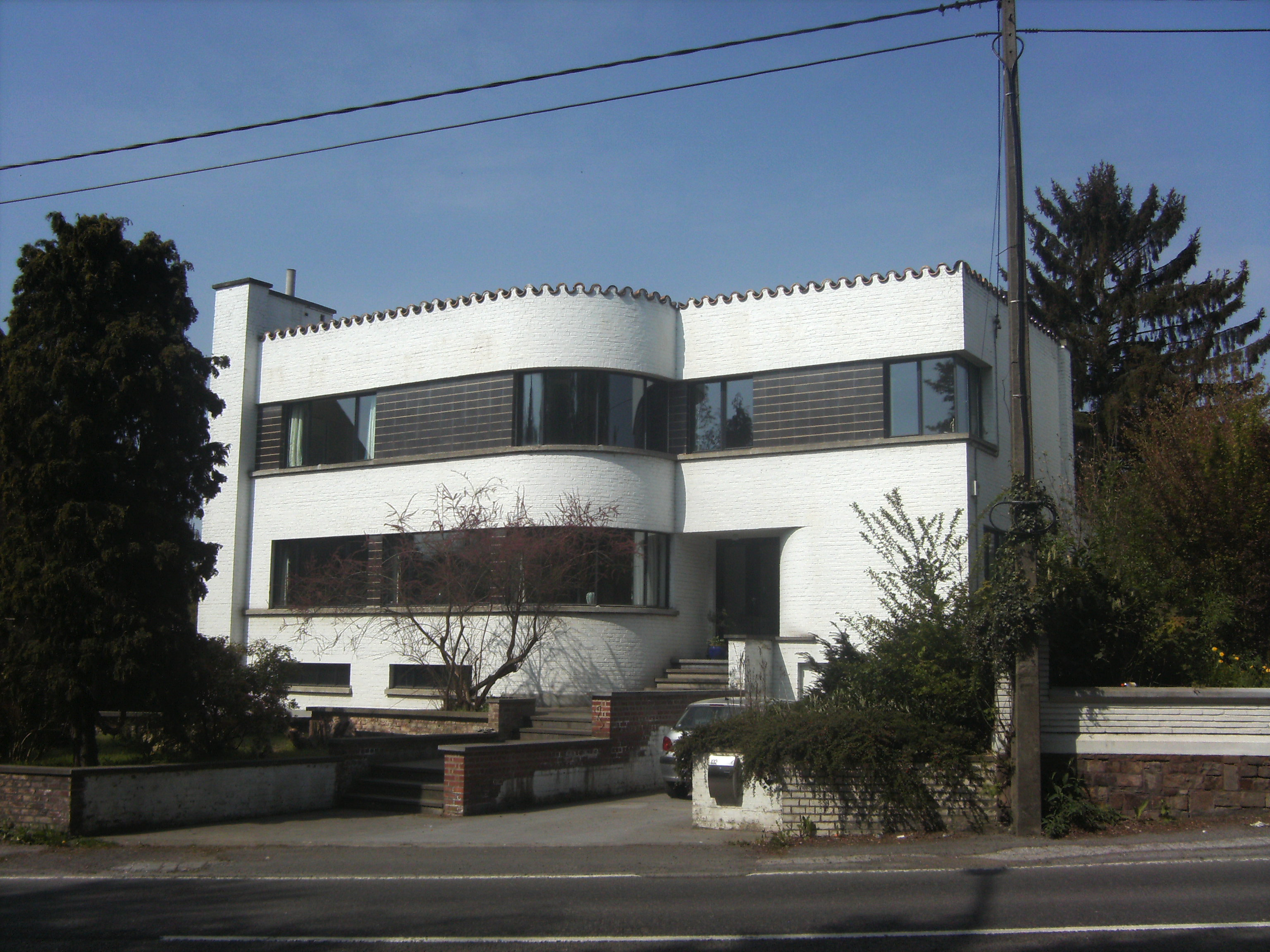
Villa Darville (Mont-sur-Marchienne)

Leborgne built the house of the sculptor Alphonse Darville in Mont-sur-Marchienne in 1937, listed in 1998.

The villa with four facades is a refined volume in painted brick, set back from the street. The main facade on the east, towards the street, is marked by the double horizontal of the bay windows, separated by black enameled brick panels on the second floor, and the flat roof hemmed in with tiles. The articulation of the main façade in two planes linked by a curve visually softens the cubic aspect of the volume.

=== Albert residence ===
Built in 1937–1938, the Albert residence in Marcinelle is a corner building, modernist, nine floors designed for Marcel Roisin. On the first floor, it has a commercial duplex and a garage for about ten cars. Above, there are eight levels with about fifteen apartments. It was listed in 2010.

=== City of Childhood ===
Pavillon de la Cité de l'Enfance (Marcinelle)

The Cité de l'Enfance is a former orphanage built in 1938 on a wooded area of more than 5 hectares. It is composed of about twenty buildings in red and ochre brick under a flat roof. Large rectangular bays with white sandstone frames illuminate the living rooms. The ensemble was listed in April 2013.

=== Van Bastelaer House ===
The Van Bastelaer House is a single-family house located in rue de Montigny in the Ville-Basse district of Charleroi (Belgium). It was built in 1932 in a style more akin to Art Nouveau for the lawyer Jules Van Bastelaer. It is an atypical work in the production of Marcel Leborgne.

This style of the house is reminiscent of the Belle Epoque, due to the use of stone, the bow-window element, balconies with a wrought-iron balustrade and round-headed windows. The internal organization is rather intimate, typical of English cottages. The stairwell is integrated into the large family room, which is the heart of the house. This central spatial element is on two levels, with a gallery on the mezzanine and covered by a glass roof.

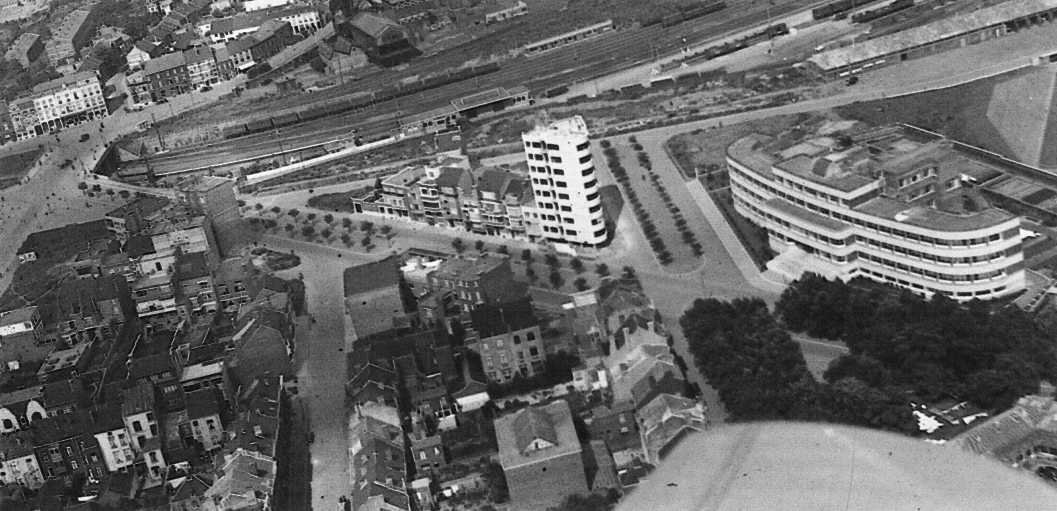
On the right, the Queen Astrid maternity hospital in 1939, in the center, the Moreau apartment building with, on its left, the Mattot house, all three works by Marcel Leborgne in Charleroi.

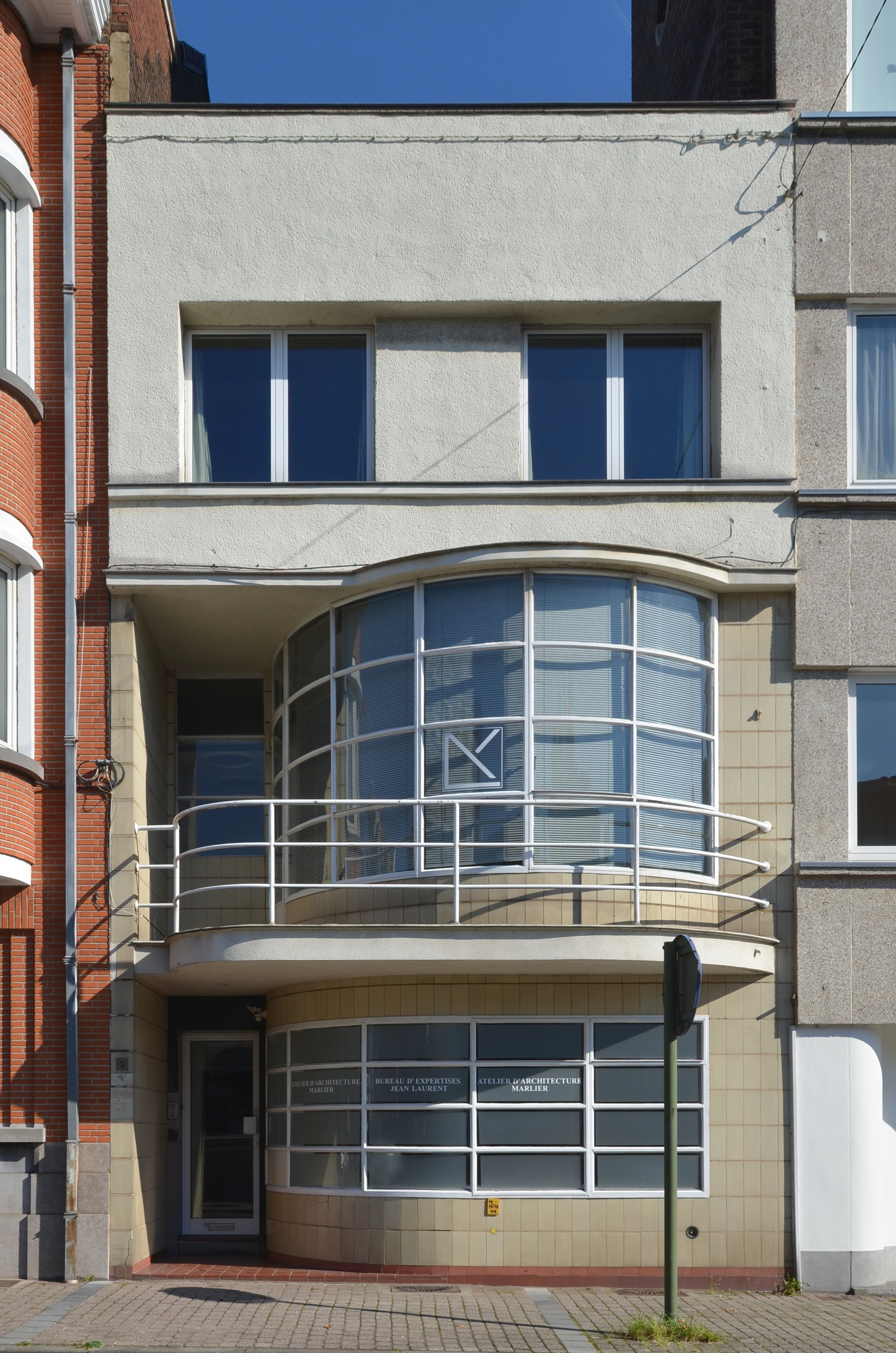
Maison Mattot House (Charleroi)

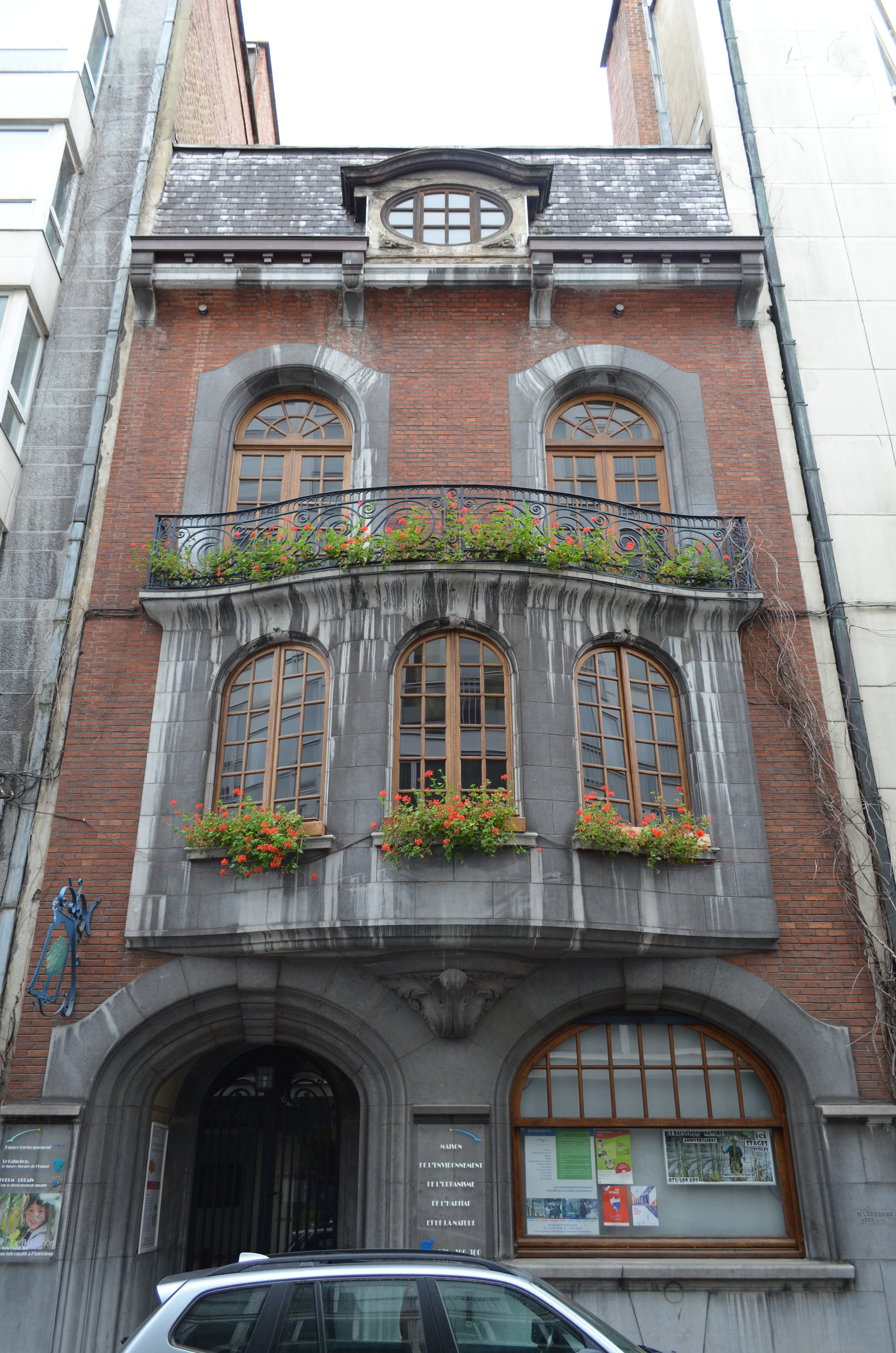
Van Bastelaer House (Charleroi)

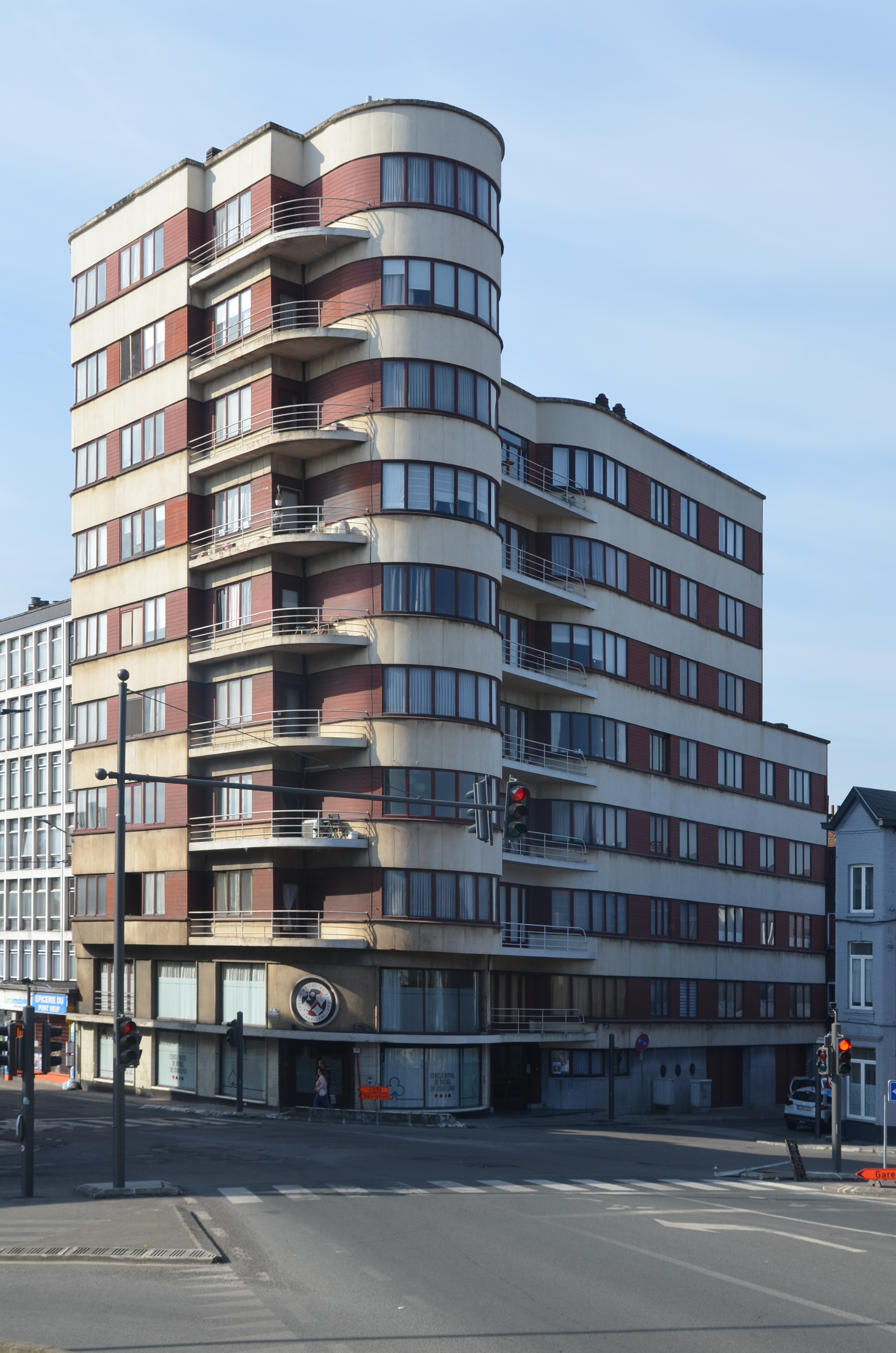
Albert residence (Marcinelle)

=== Queen Astrid Maternity Hospital ===
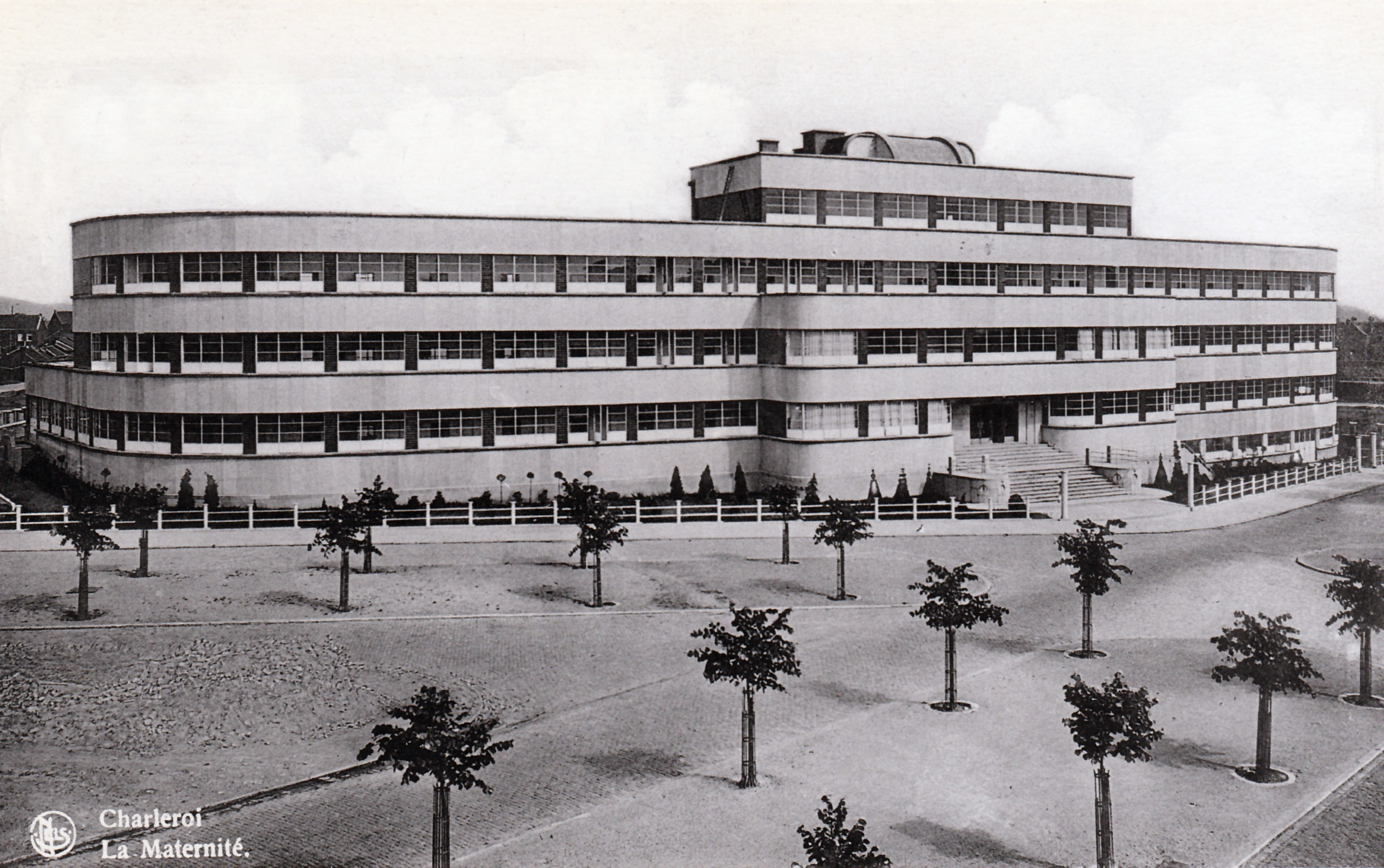
Queen Astrid Maternity Hospital (1938)

Inaugurated in 1937 and demolished in 1988, the Queen Astrid Maternity Hospital was presented as a curved building where horizontality was accentuated by superimposed and alternate bands of pink stones and glass. Except in the middle part, the layout of the rooms is unilateral. The corridors, placed in front of the building, play the role of thermal and acoustic regulator.

=== Mattot house ===
Built in 1937 in Charleroi for Dr Henri Mattot, then director of the nearby Queen Astrid maternity hospital. It is a semi-detached bourgeois house whose plan respects the programme "housing for a single gynaecologist: consulting room on the first floor, living quarters on the second floor". The main façade is animated by two curved glass windows. The one on the first floor is curved towards the entrance. The one on the first floor is rounded and forms a slight projection on the plane of the façade, opening up the interior to the street. The latter is preceded by a balcony in the form of a balustrade. The plot on which the house is built connects two perpendicular streets. The plan of the house is therefore angular, with the front and rear façades offset. The first floor was conceived as a vast space, completely open to the different functions: living, eating, hygiene and rest.

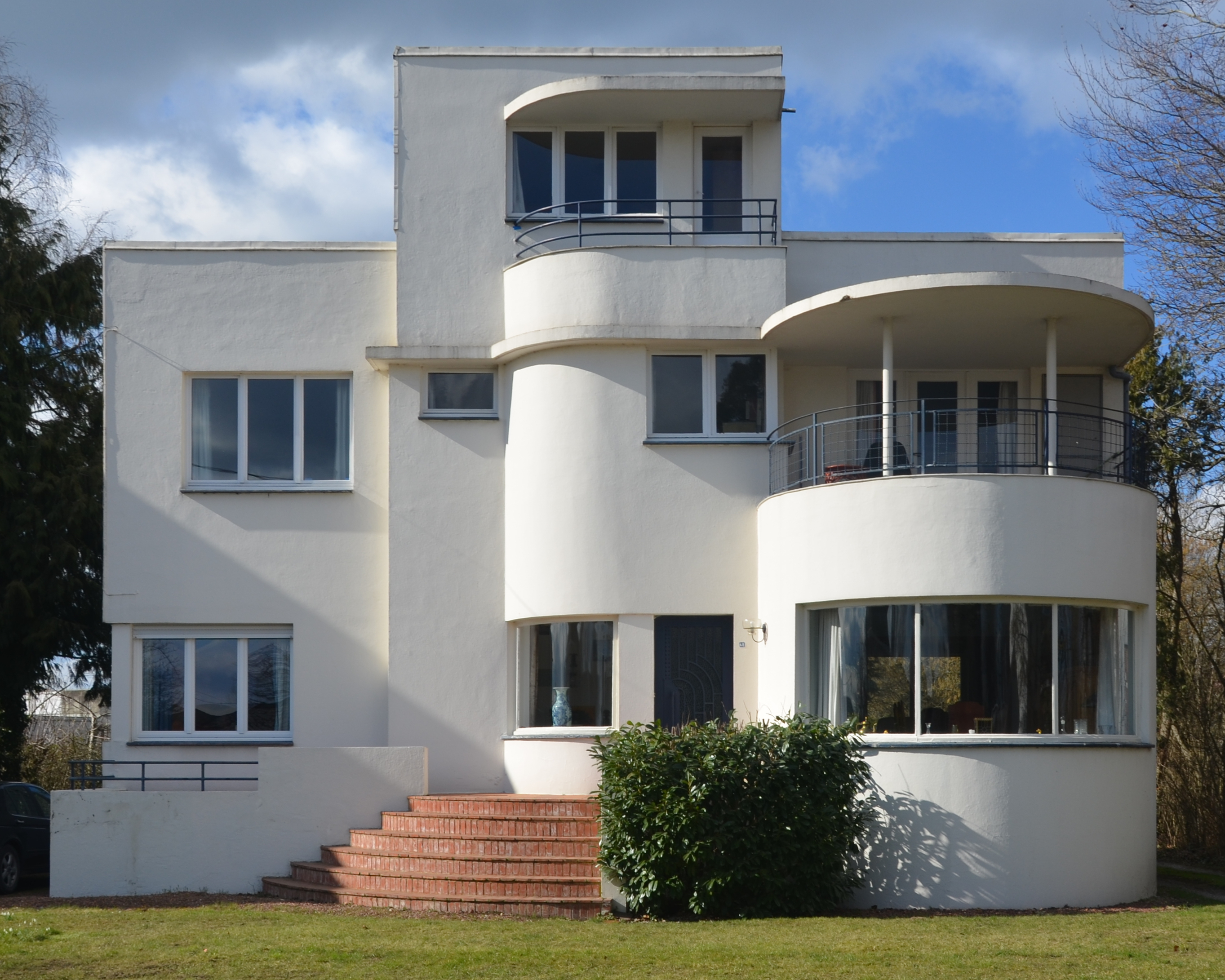
Villa Malter (Mariembourg)

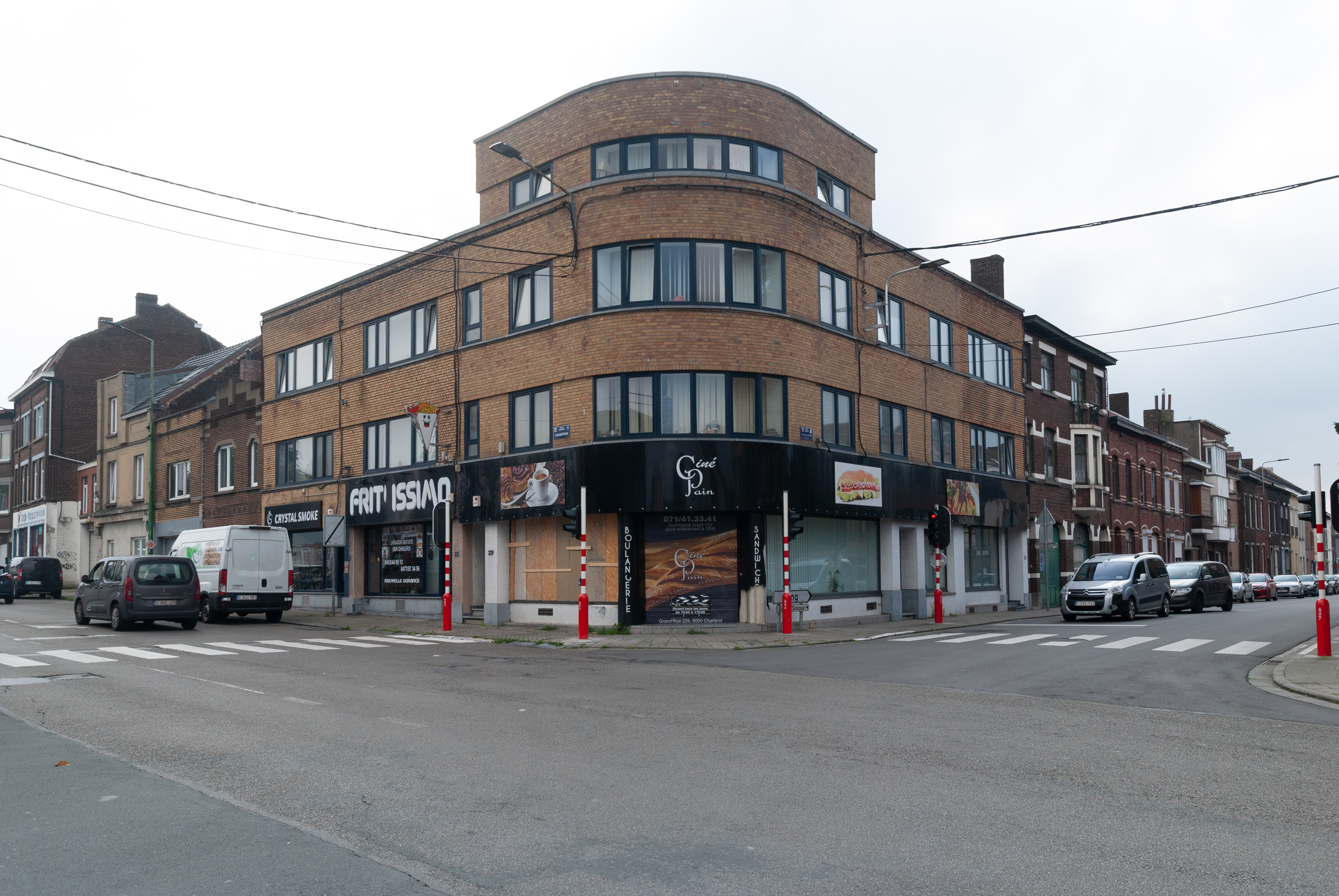
Dickmans building (Charleroi)

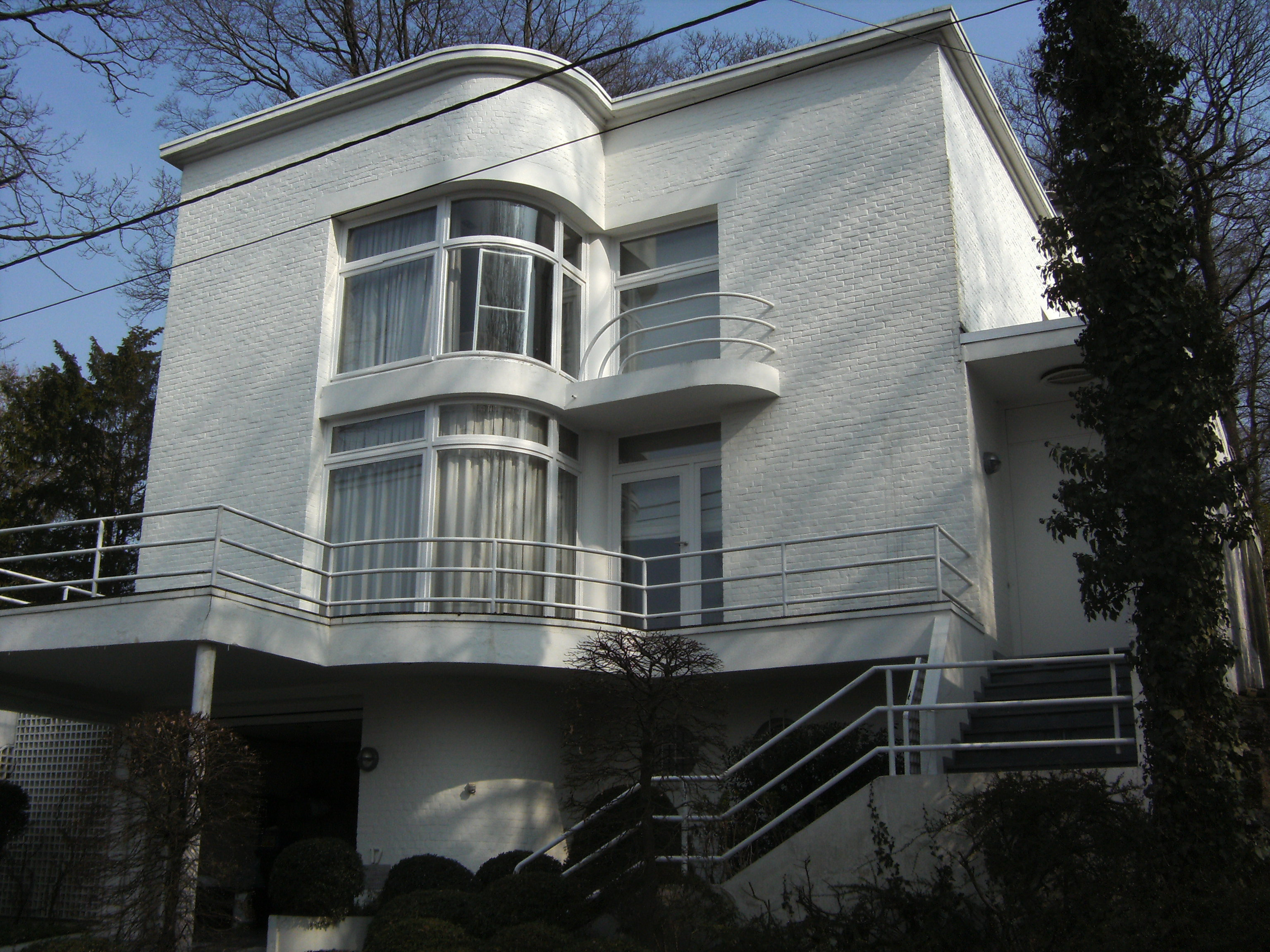
Villa Paquet (Loverval)

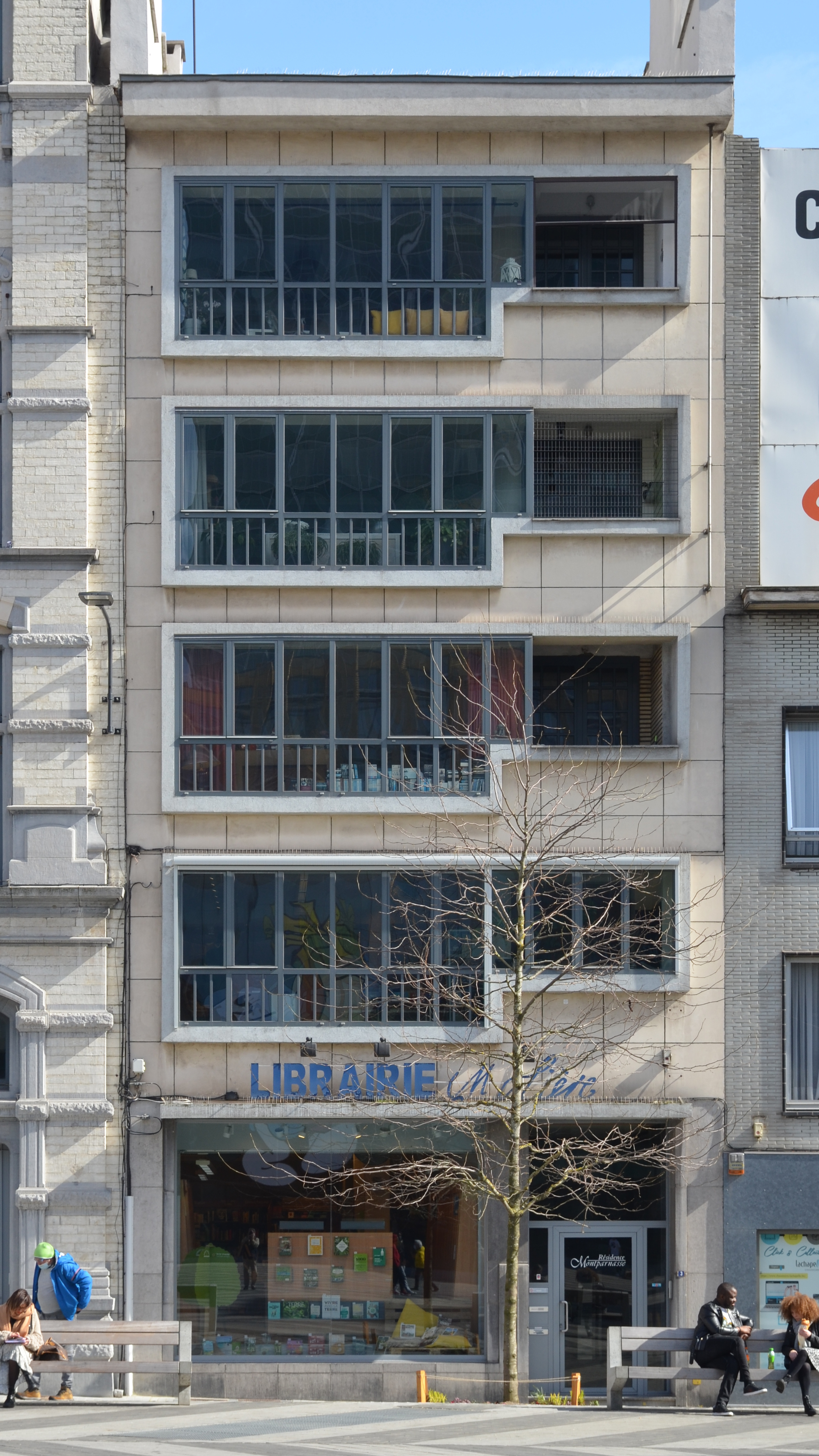
Apartment building (Charleroi)

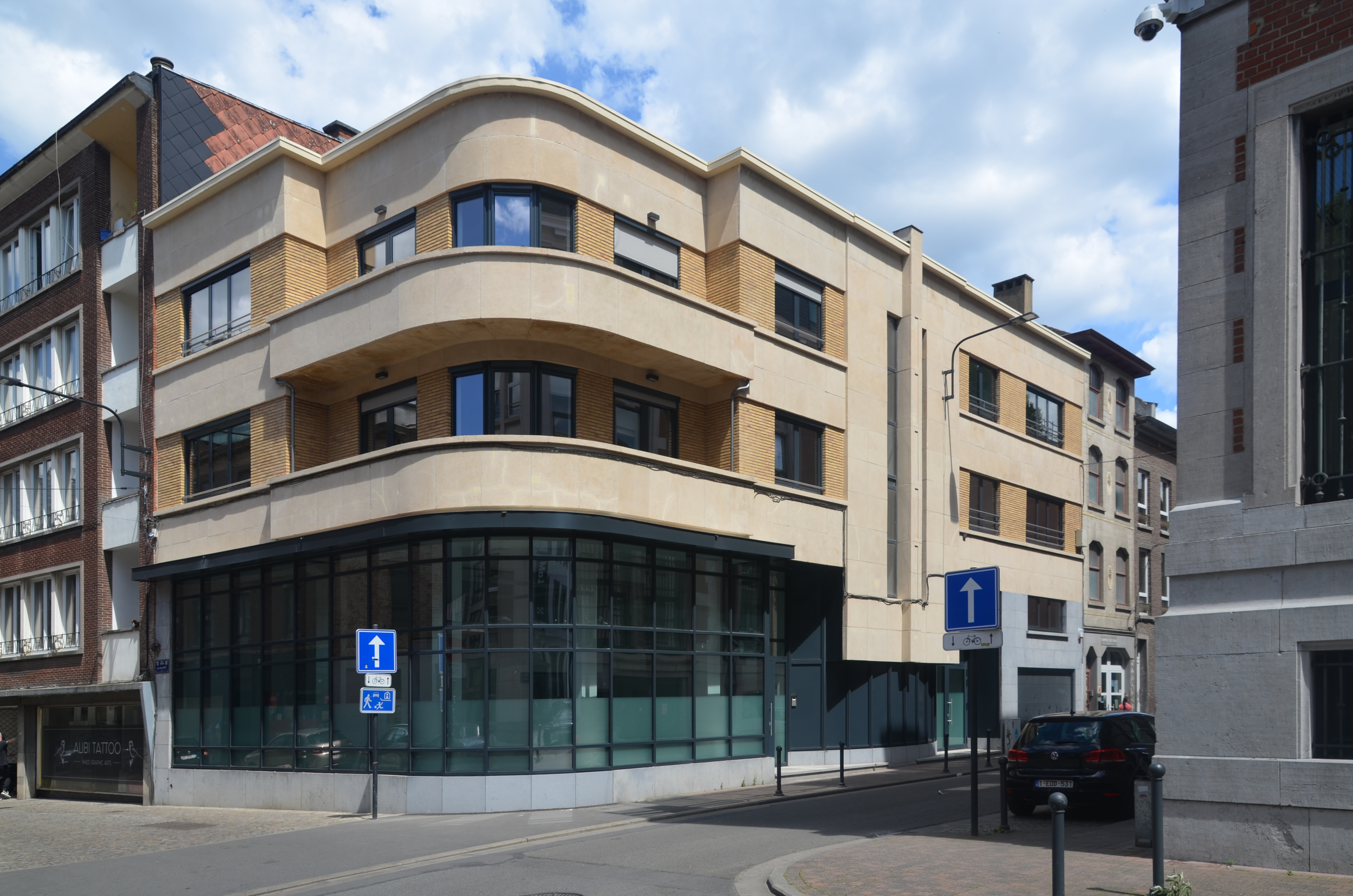
Dolpire house (Charleroi)

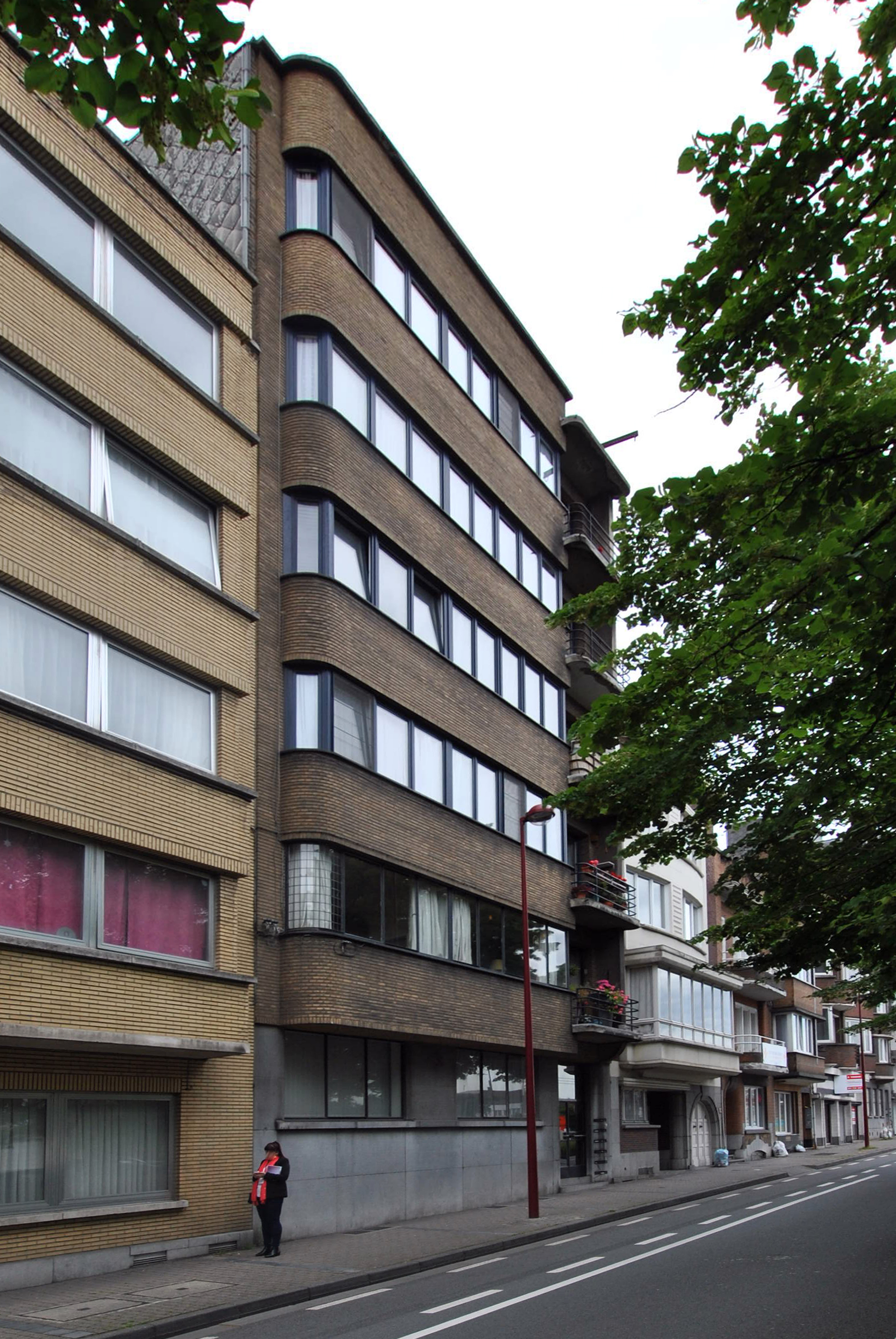
Henry Apartment building (Charleroi)

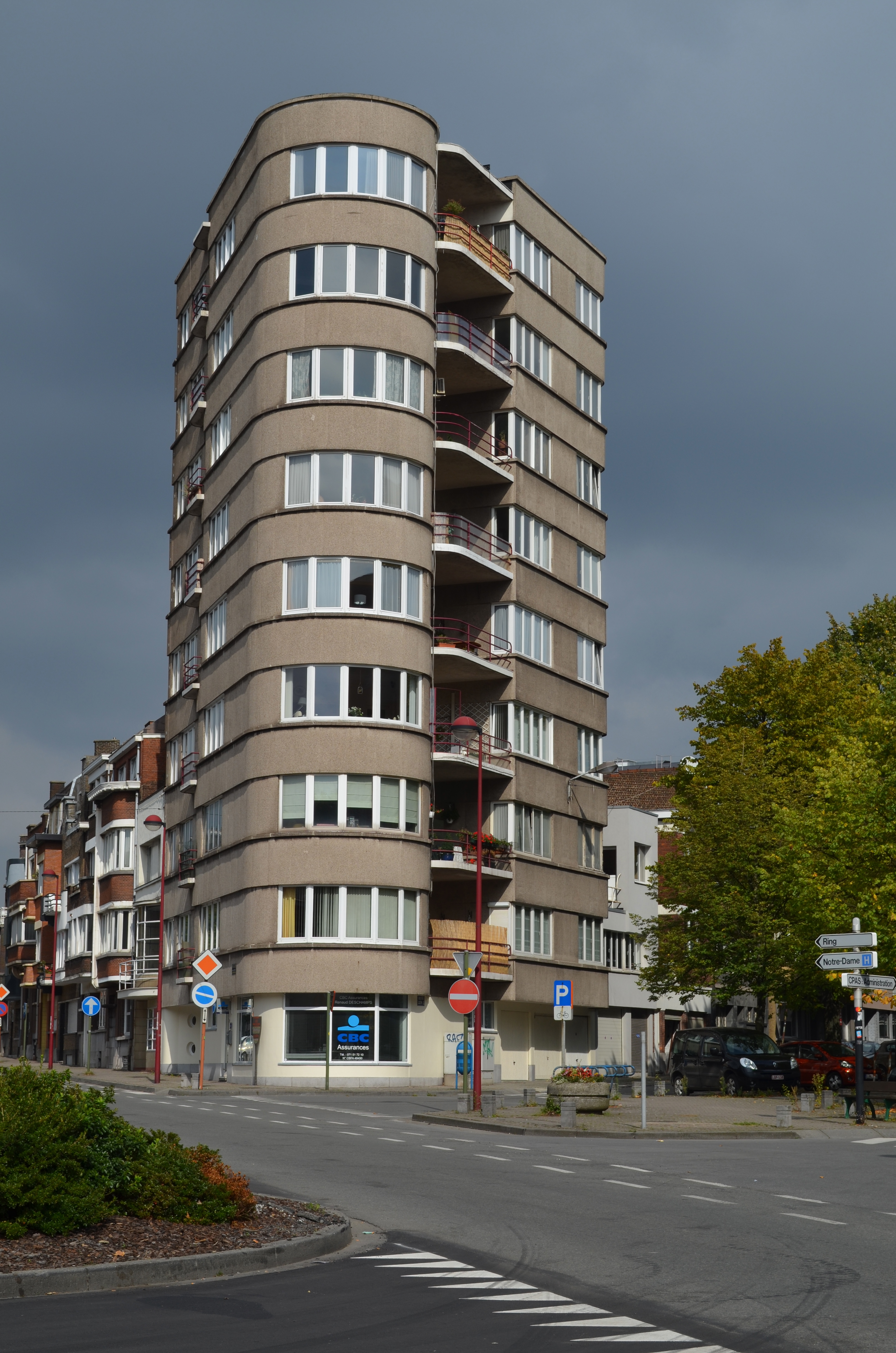
Moreau apartment building (Charleroi)

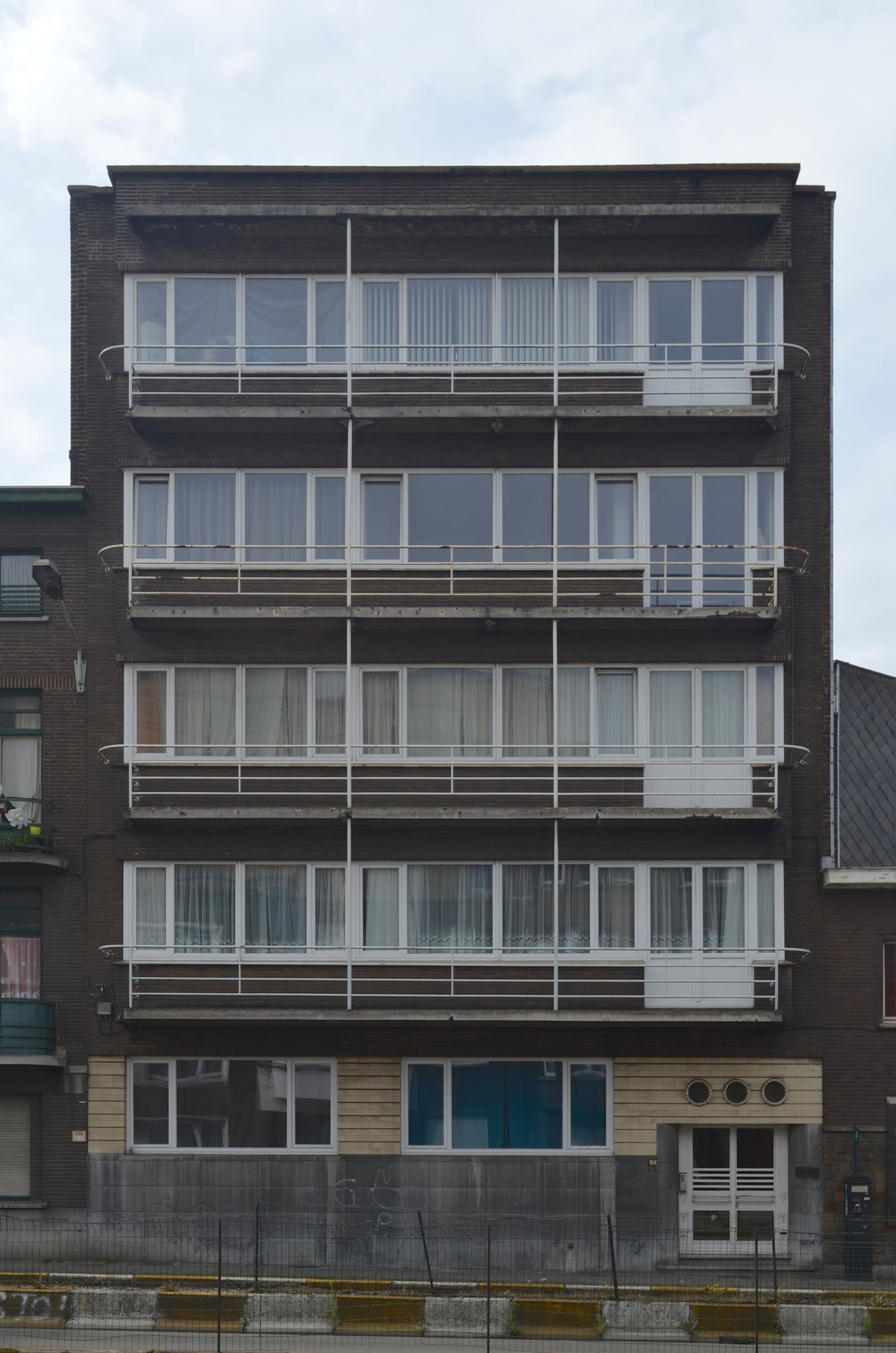
Résidence Université apartment building (Charleroi)

== Bibliography ==
- Espace Environnement, ed. (2004). ...A Charleroi, Marcel Leborgne. Architectes qui ont construit la ville de Charleroi (in French). Charleroi.
- "Wallonie, Hainaut, Arrondissement de Charleroi". Le patrimoine monumental de la Belgique (in French). Vol. 20. Liège: Pierre Mardaga. 1994. p. 602. ISBN 2-87009-588-0.
- Aubry, Françoise; Vandenbreeden, Jos; Vanlaethem, France (2006). Architecture en Belgique – Art nouveau, Art déco & Modernisme (in French). Bruxelles: Éditions Racine. pp. 372–373. ISBN 978-2-87386-467-5.
- Bioul, Anne-Catherine (2004). Vivre aujourd'hui dans un intérieur d'autrefois, à Charleroi. Monuments et sites (in French). Namur: Ministère de la Région wallonne. ISBN 2-87401-171-1.
- Bioul, Anne-Catherine (2009). "Marcel Leborgne ou le choix de la modernité "humaine"" (PDF). In Service Public de Wallonie (ed.). Les Cahiers de l'Urbanisme (in French). Vol. 73. Éditions Mardaga. pp. 81–85. ISBN 978-2-8047-0029-4.
- Breydel, Louis-Philippe (2009). Marcel Leborgne – Villa Dirickz (in French). Alice Éditions. p. 160. ISBN 978-2-87426-118-3.
- Flouquet, Pierre Louis (1934). "Les frères Leborgne" (PDF). Bâtir (in French). 20 (7): 778–781.
- Flouquet, Pierre-Louis (1937). "La nouvelle "maternité" de Charleroi – L'architecture au service de la vie" (PDF). Bâtir (in French). 54 (5): 1192–1196.
- Flouquet, Pierre Louis (1939). "Marcel Leborgne, constructeur lyrique" (PDF). Bâtir (in French). 80 (7): 297–329.
- Folville, Xavier (1988). "Modernismes et Belgicismes. Paysages de l'architecture belge de l'entre-deux-guerres". Le Corbusier et le Mouvement moderne en Belgique (in French). hdl:2268/240078. OCLC 1120419253.
- Strauven, Iwan (2003). "Leborgne Marcel". In Van Loo, Anne (ed.). Dictionnaire de l'architecture en Belgique de 1830 à nos jours (in French). Anvers: Fonds Mercator. pp. 390–391. ISBN 90-6153-526-3.
- Strauven, Iwan (1999). De Kooning, Mil (ed.). Horta and after : 25 masters of modern architecture in Belgium. Ghent: Dept. of Architecture and Urbanism, University of Ghent. pp. 108–119. ISBN 978-9076714011.
- Pouleur, Jean Alexandre; Bioul, Anne-Catherine; Dauchot, Alain (1992). Charleroi, ville d'architectures – Du Temps des Forteresses aux years Folles 1666–1940 (in French). Brussels: Atelier Ledoux, Espace Environnement. p. 75.
- Strauven, Iwan; Le Maire, Judith; Dailly, Marie-Noëlle (2017). 1881-2017 Charleroi métropole. Guide d'architecture moderne et contemporaine. Vol. 4. Brussels: Mardaga and Cellule architecture de la Fédération Wallonie-Brussels. p. 152. ISBN 9782804703677.
