= Kundu (drum) =

Hourglass drum from Papua New Guinea

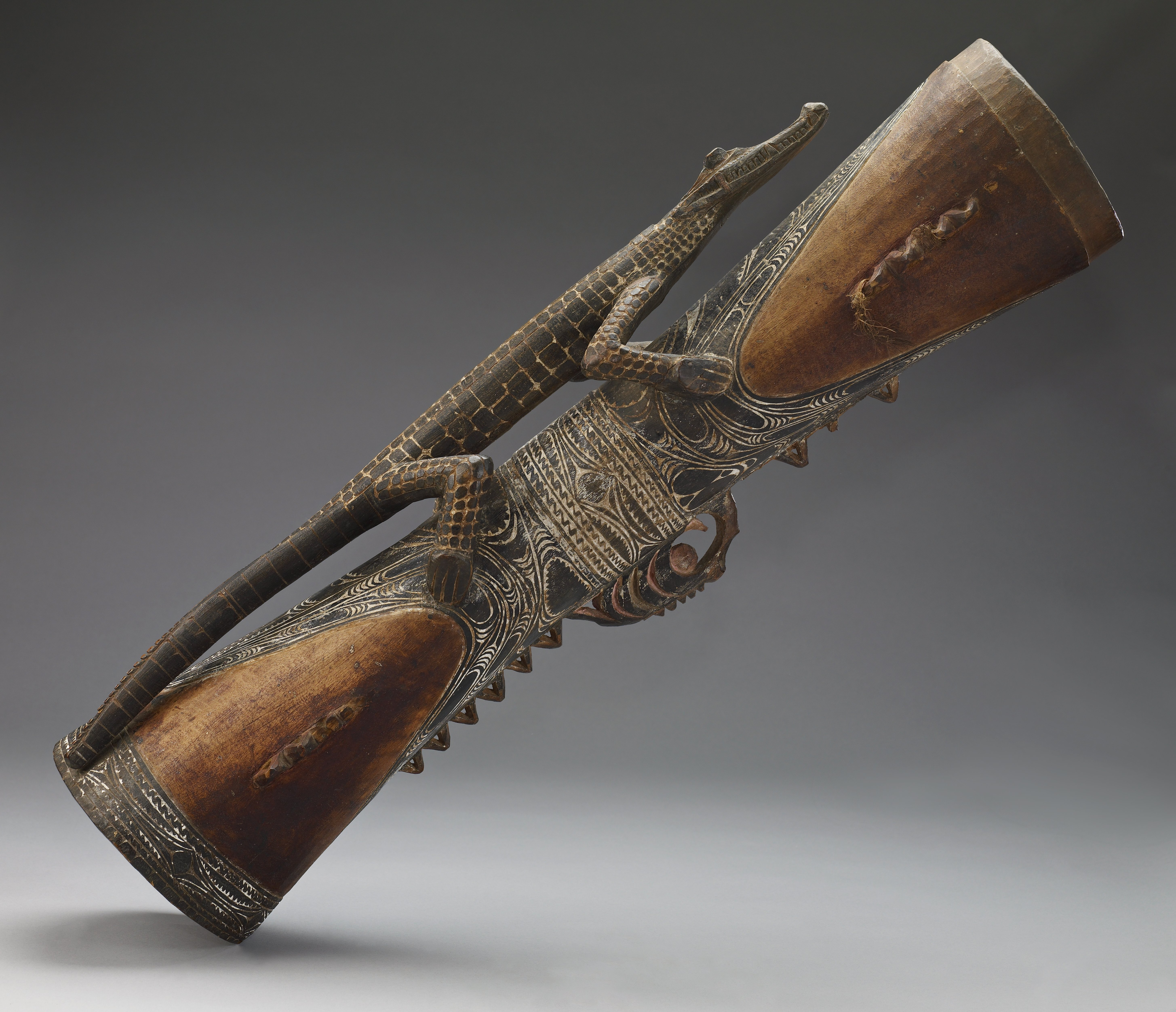
Kundu drum, from Papua-New Guinea, Iatmul people, 20th century. The crocodile is symbolic to the Iatmul, who believe they are descended from a giant crocodile, and that the world is the back of that first crocodile. There are three crocodiles on this instrument: the handle and each of the drum openings (seen in the engravings).

Kundu is a pidgin name in Papua New Guinea for an hourglass drum used to accompany formal occasions, religious ceremonies and for celebrations (such as the Sing-sing). This drum is emblematic of Papua New Guinea and it appears on the country's coat of arms.

== Characteristics ==
The sizes of a kundu drum vary. A small finger-drum might measure 30 cm (11.81 in), while a large drum might be 200 cm (74.84 in) long.

The drum is made of carved wood with a possum or lizard-skin drumhead, with some instruments possessing a handle placed on the narrowest part of the drum. Not all kundus have handles, depending on the instruments' style. Traditionally, the lizard skin was held in place with a layer of human blood (as glue).

Depending upon who made it and where it was made, a kundu may be carved plainly, or decorated with "high-relief" carved handles, or relief carvings on the instruments' bodies with open mouthed crocodiles, human faces, dancers, and "spirit figures". Often, the kundu is decorated with animal figures on its edges. On some instruments the handle may have intricate sculpture in (openwork style).

For the Papuans, the sound of the Kundu represents the voice of "spirits". Examples of formal religious or civil occasions where one might hear the Kundu include burials, the opening of a new house or the launching of a new boat.

== Other names ==
The hourglass drum is widespread in New Guinea and many surrounding islands, a land with more than 700 different languages. There is no tradition for the instrument in "New Ireland, Manus, Buka / Bougainville or Rossel Island".

While different people's may have the drum, their names and traditions for the instrument vary. Other names include the apa (Elema People, Papua Gulf) and the warup from the Torres Straits.

=== Tifa ===
In the Indonesian western end of New Guinea, the tradition of making kundu drums has been affected by the drum-making tradition of other Indonesian Islands, especially the Maluku Islands. The Maluku Iskands drums are known under the name tifa. That name has become used for some New Guinean hourglass drums.

The Asmat people in the Papua province of Indonesia, make hourglass drums covered with decorative symbolic carvings, including the handle. One thing that is different on the Asmat's drums from the kundu drums is that the Asmat secure the skin with a tightly fitted, slip-on ring of rattan, after the skin is glued down.

They use tifa for their carved hourglass drum.

Although drums such as the Asmat's and Marind's are now called "tifa", it may not be appropriate to use the word as a synonym for all kundu drums. The Indonesian word has been applied to hourglass drums, but not exclusively. Other drums that tifa applies to include goblet drums, and to the barrel drums played in the Maluku Islands' Tifa totobuang ensemble and in the Papuan Sing-sing.

== Gallery ==
Coat of arms for Papua New Guinea, featuring a Kundu drum underneath a Raggiana bird-of-paradise

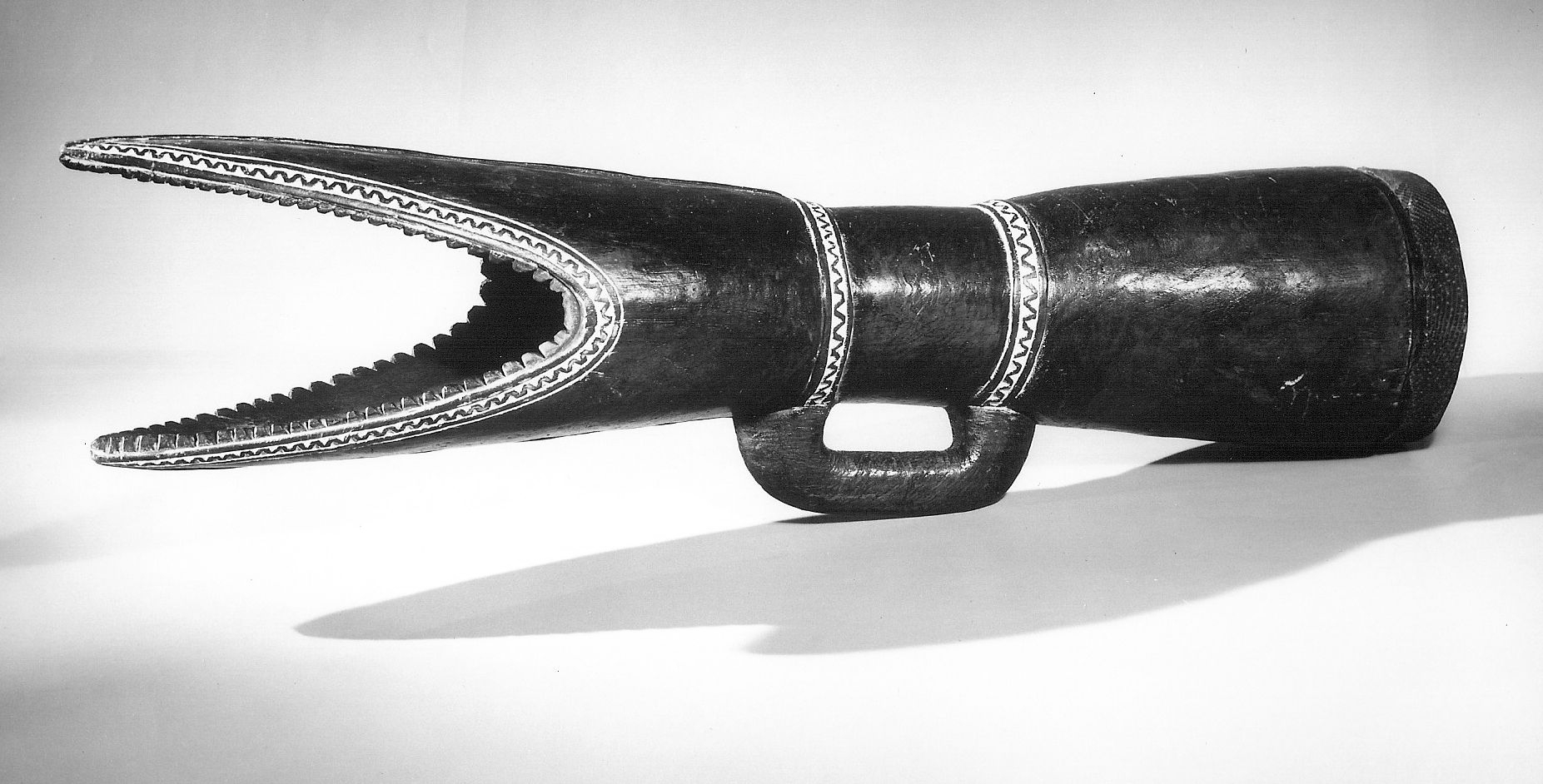
Apa drum, Elema culture, Papuan Gulf, Papua New Guinea, This drum also has crocodile-like art.

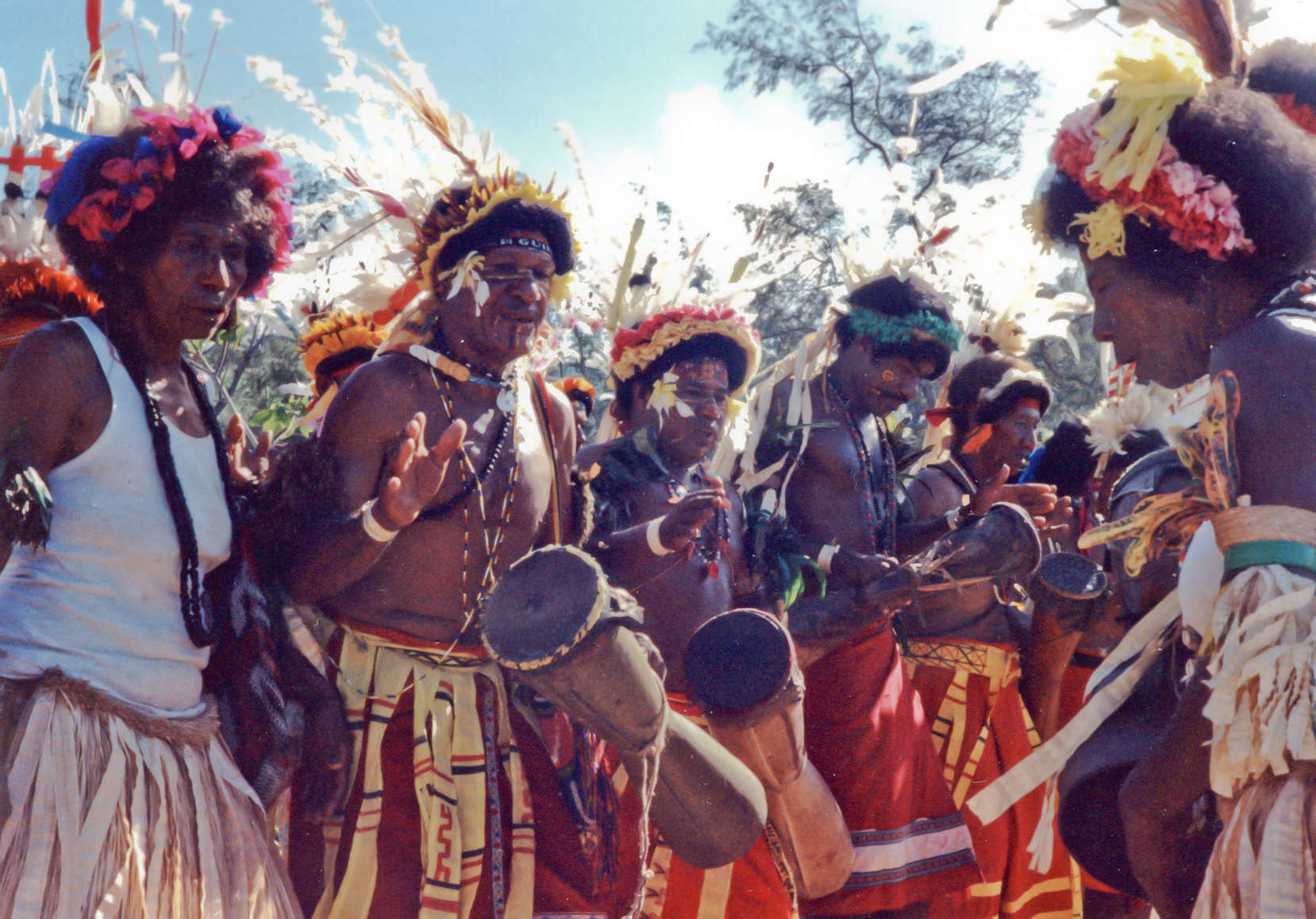
Musicians playing kundu drums at Port Moresby

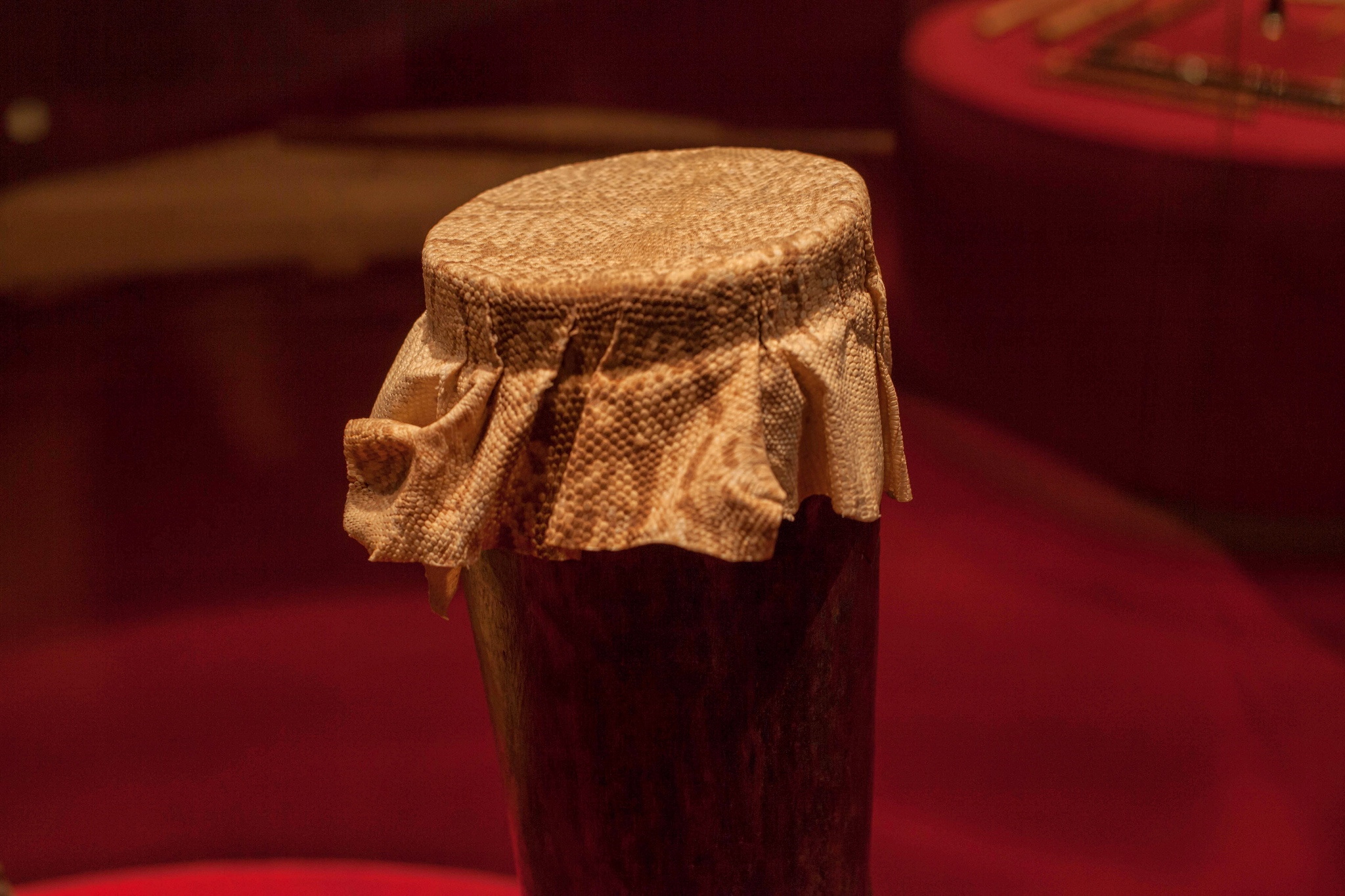
Skin head on a kundu at Museu de la Música de Barcelona

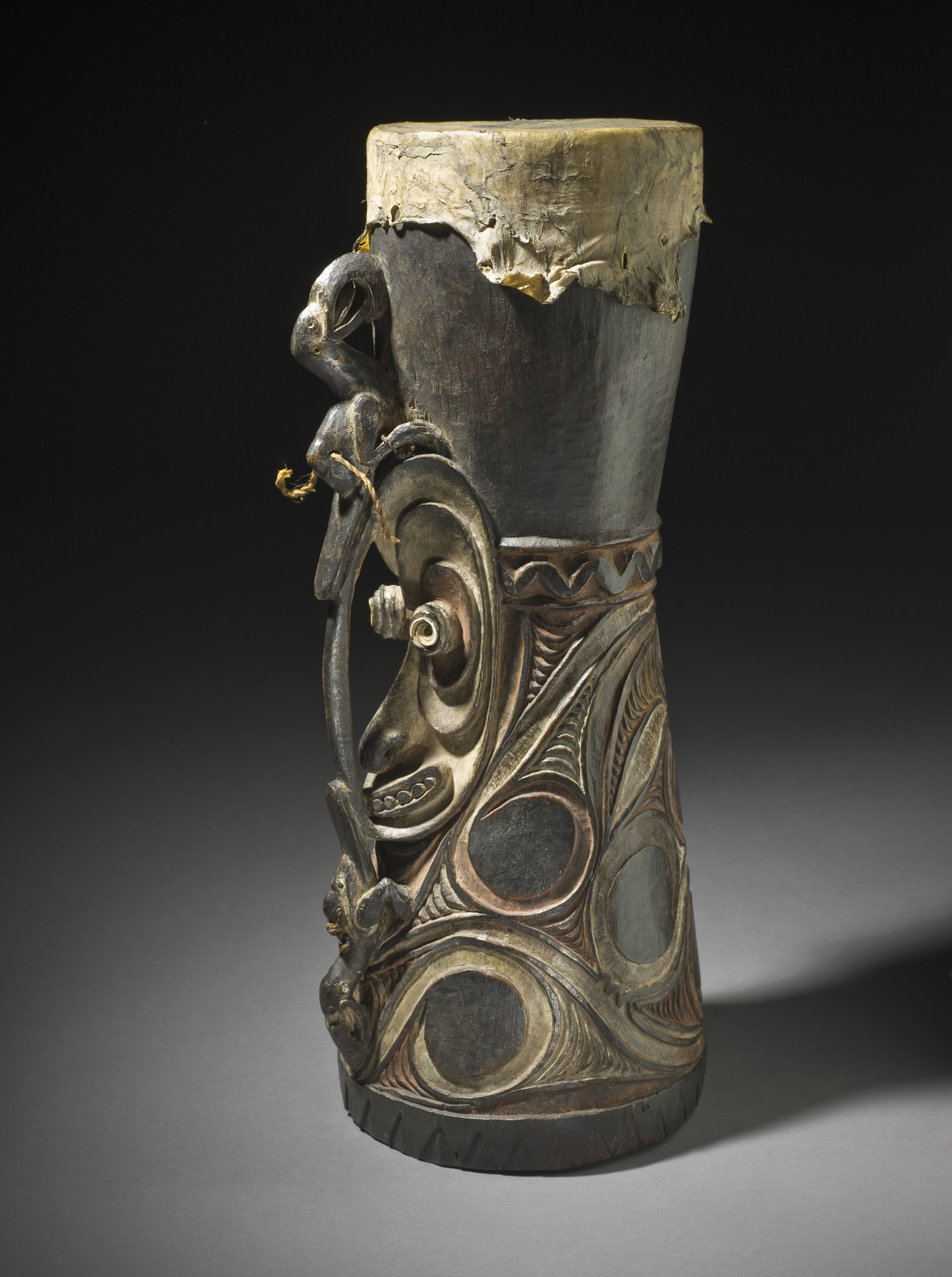
Papua New Guinea, East Sepik Province, Eastern Iatmul People, circa 1909

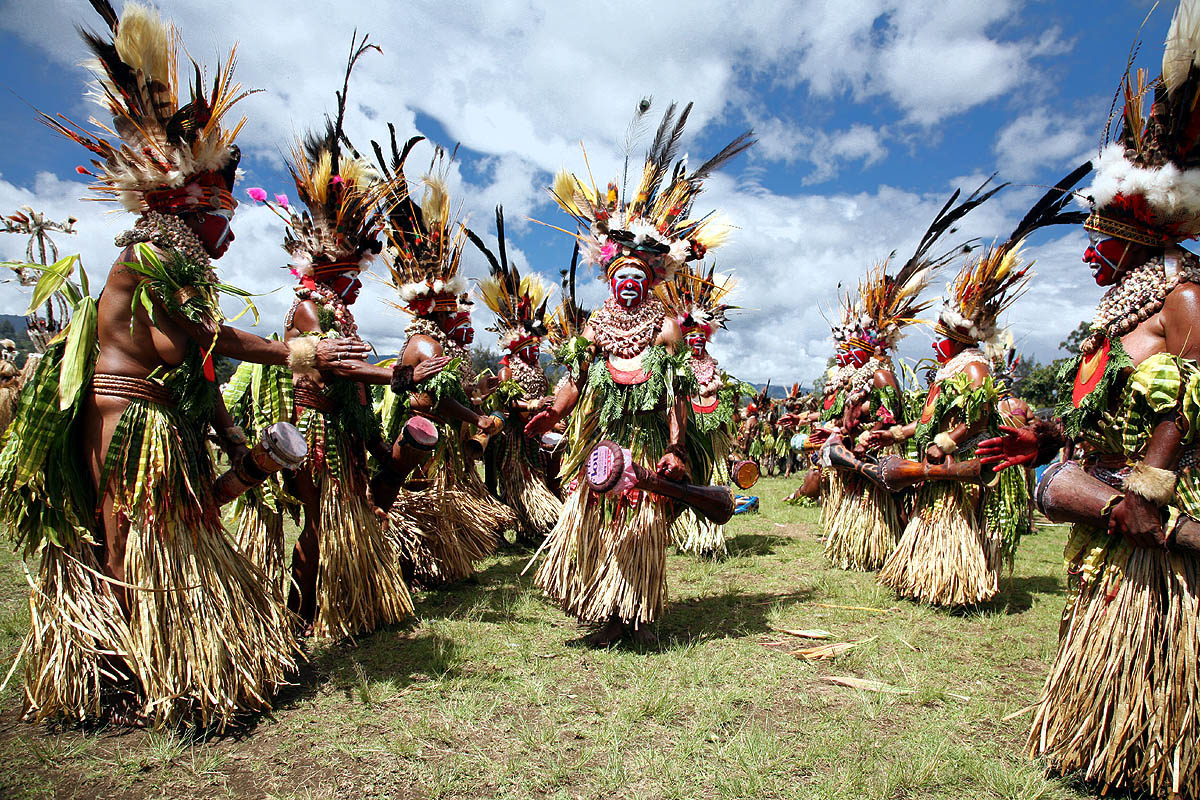
Wabag, Enga Province, Papua New Guinea. Performers at a Sing-sing. The kundus have rings around the skin head, like those made by the Asmat.

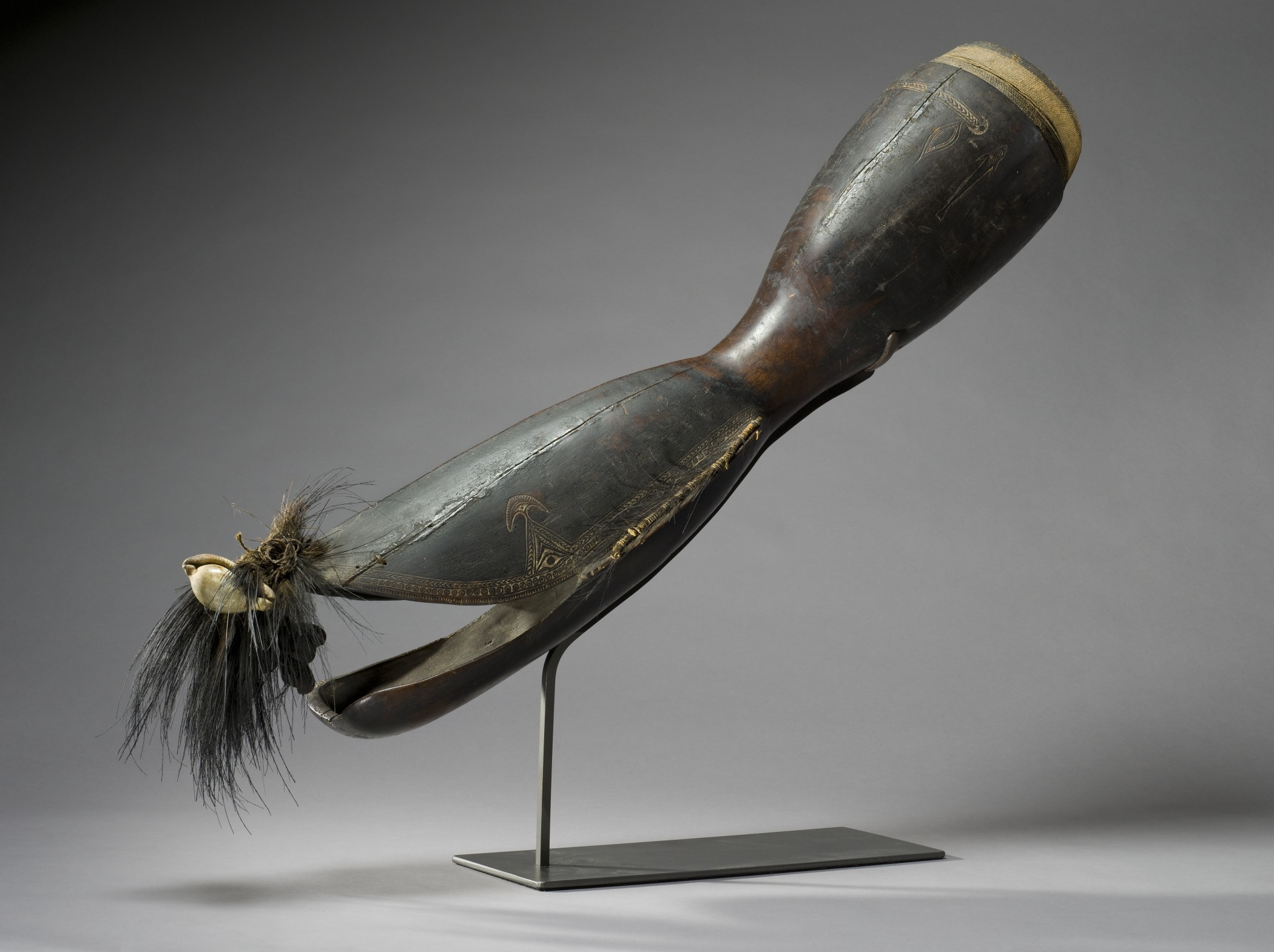
Warup people, Papua New Guinea, Torres Strait Islands, circa 1850

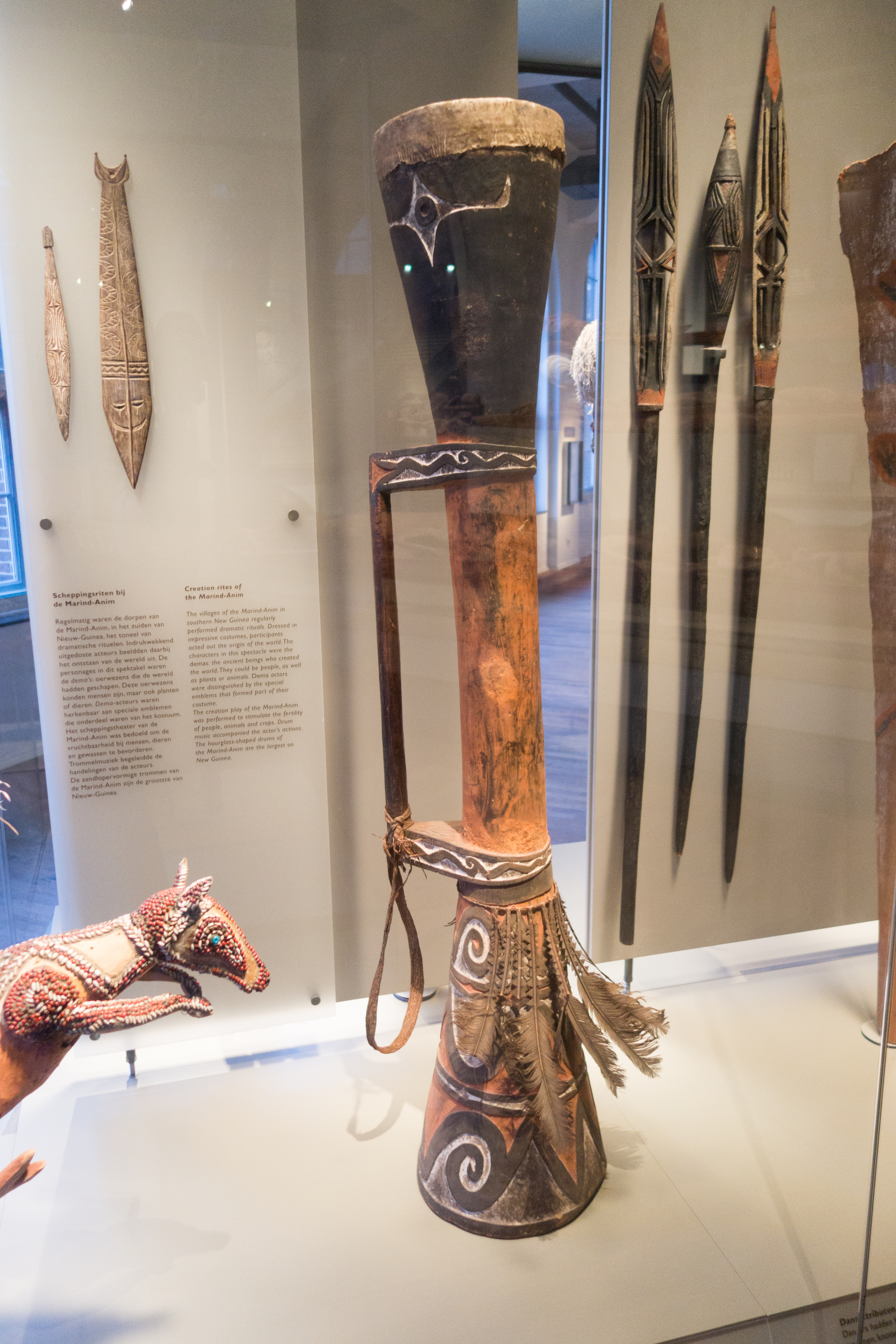
Kandara, Marind-Anim ceremonial Dema drum

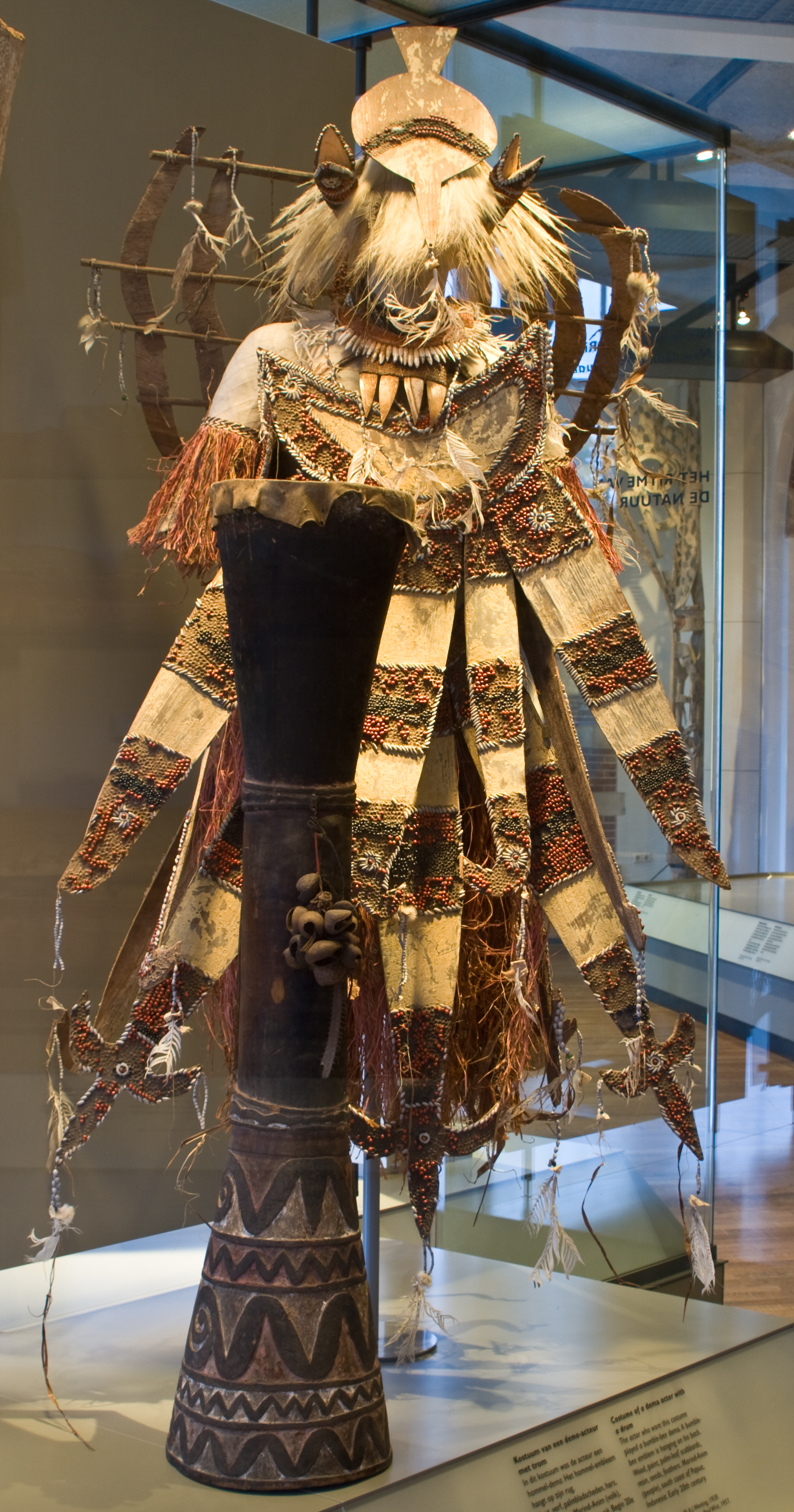
Kandara and Dema costume

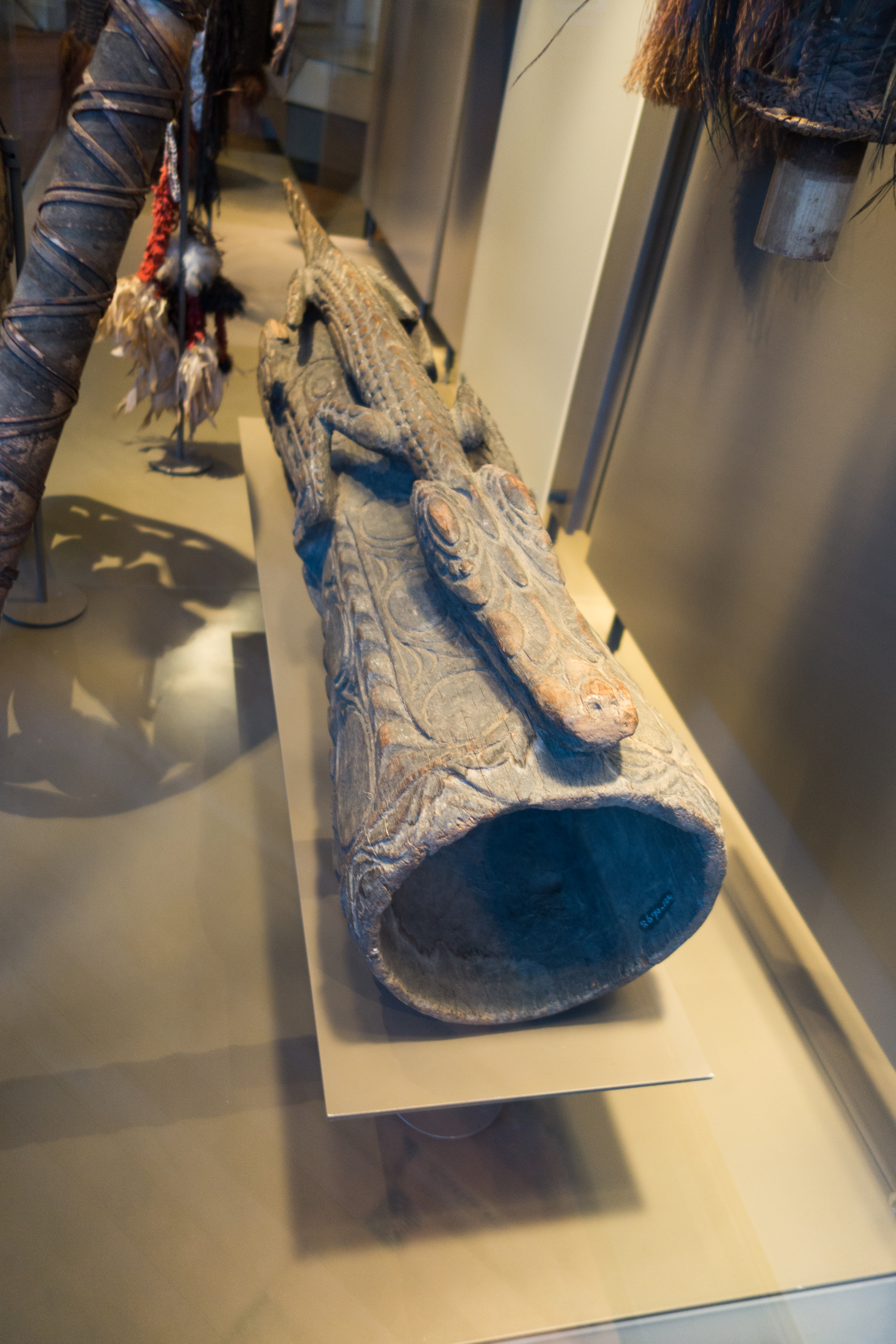
Large kundu, log drum

=== Tifa drums ===
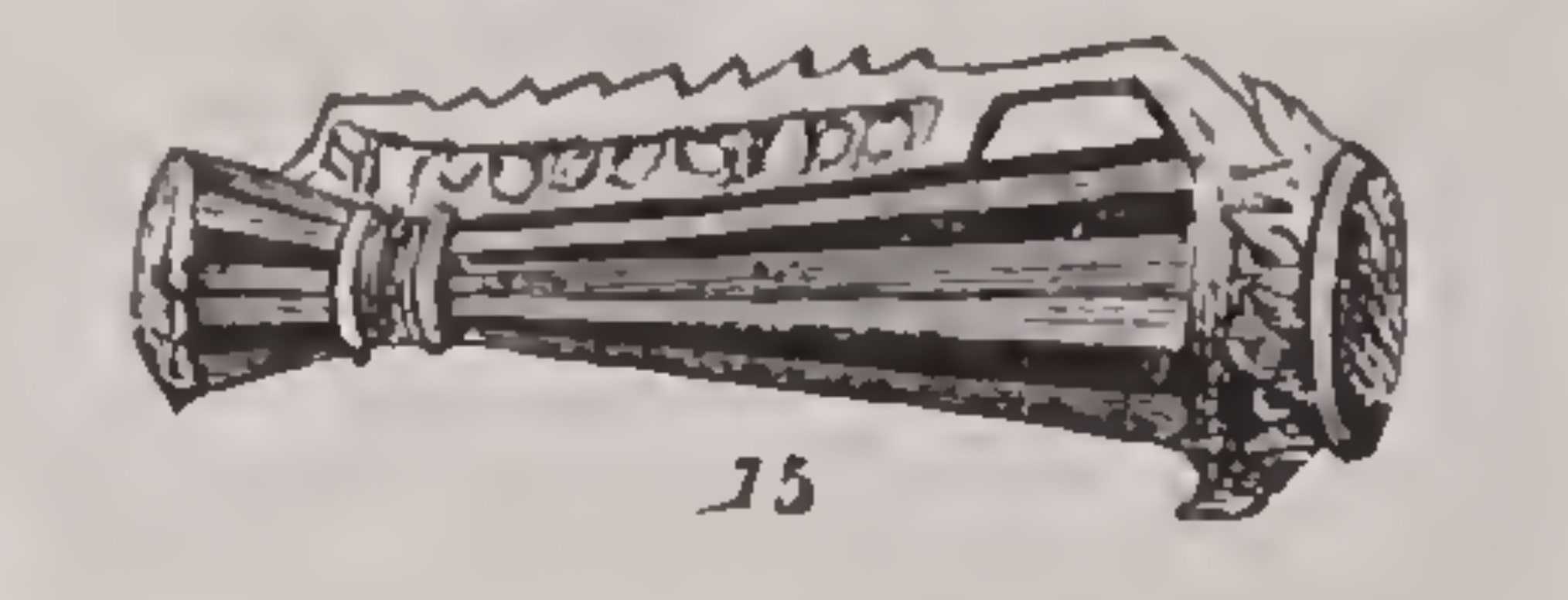
"Tifa" drum from Manokwari (then called Dorei or Doreh, 1885. The Asmat people are among the inhabitants of Manokwari.

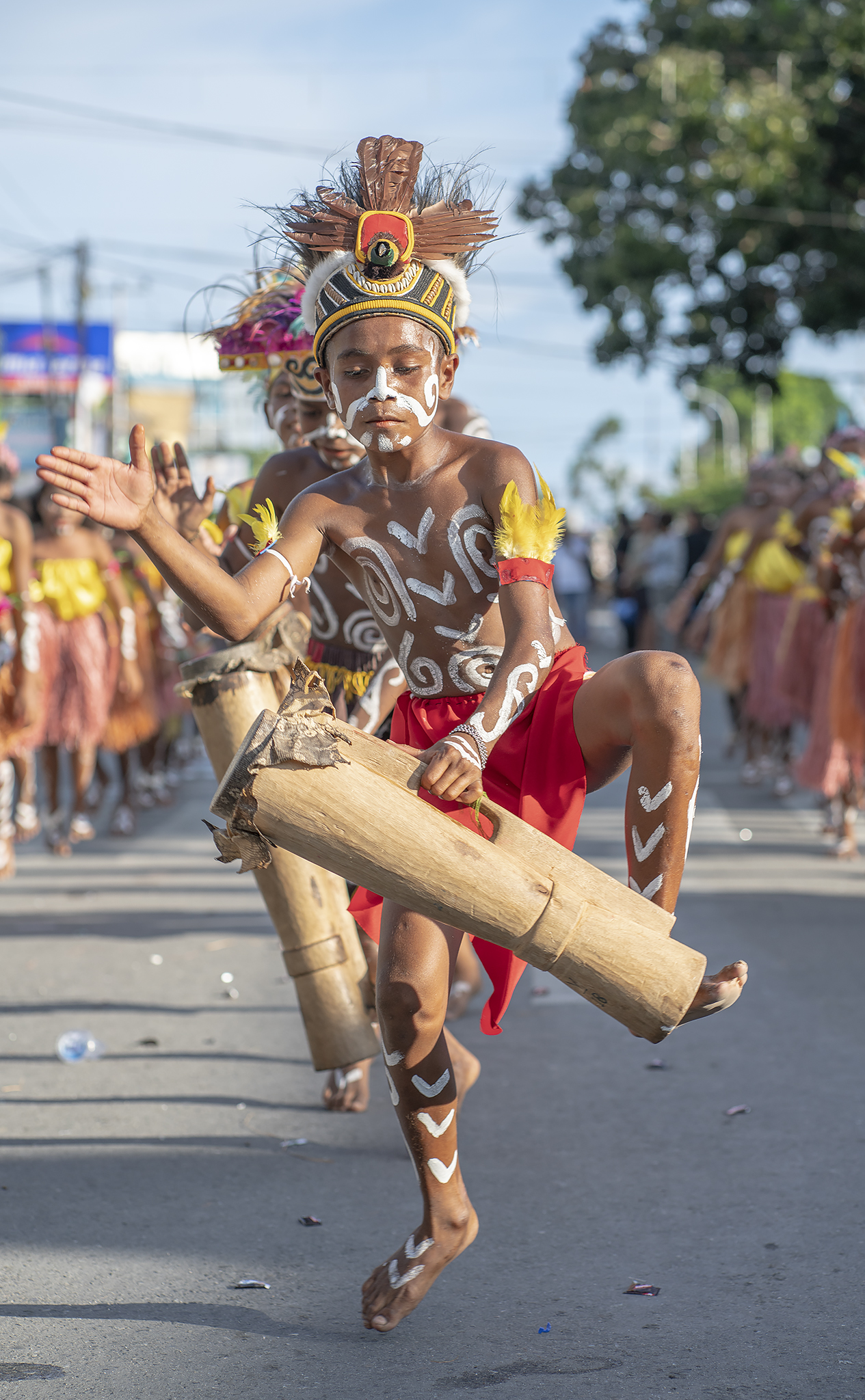
Biak. Tifa drum. By putting the narrow part of the hourglass near the bottom, this drum begins to resemble a goblet drum.

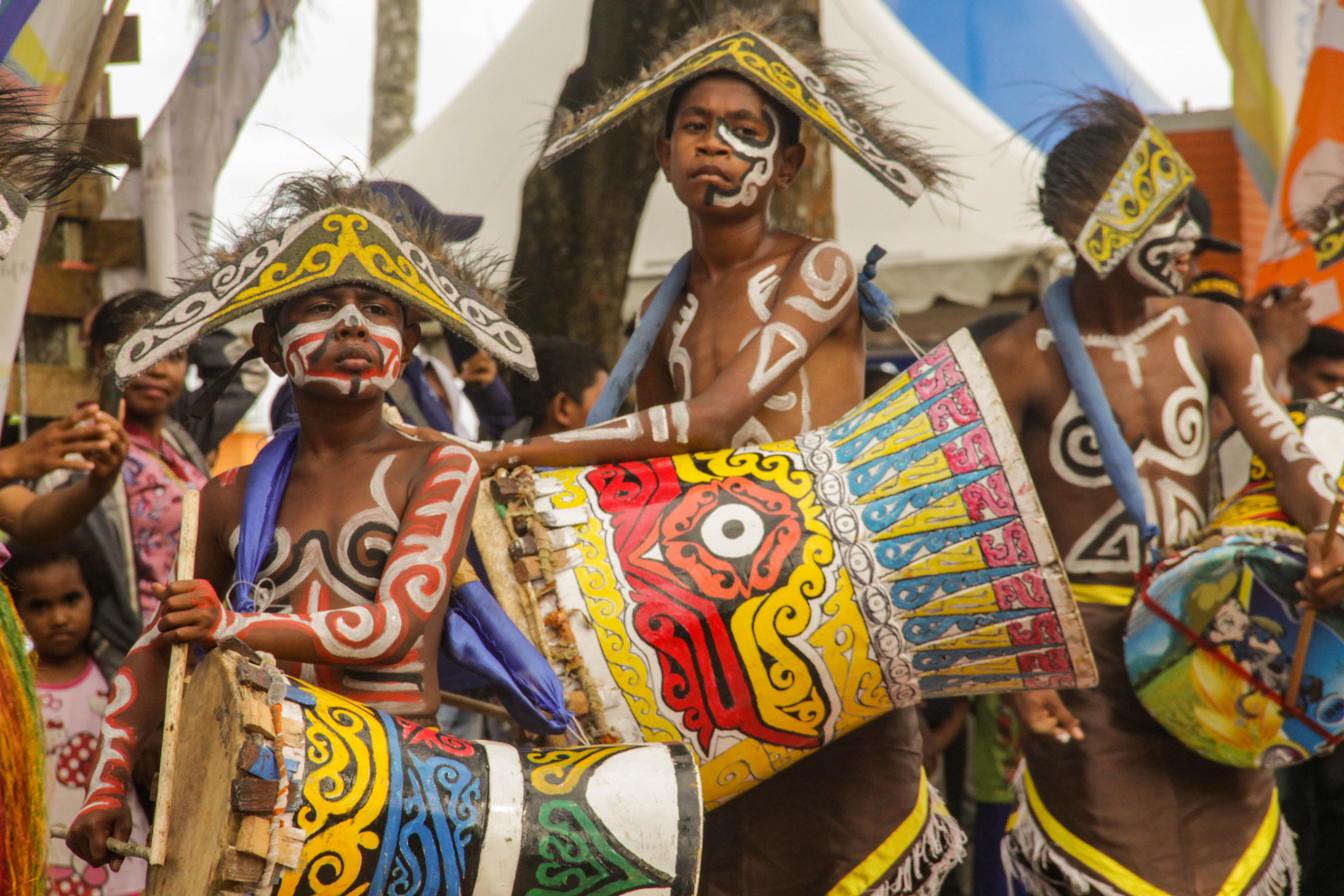
Tifa drums at a Papuan Sing-sing

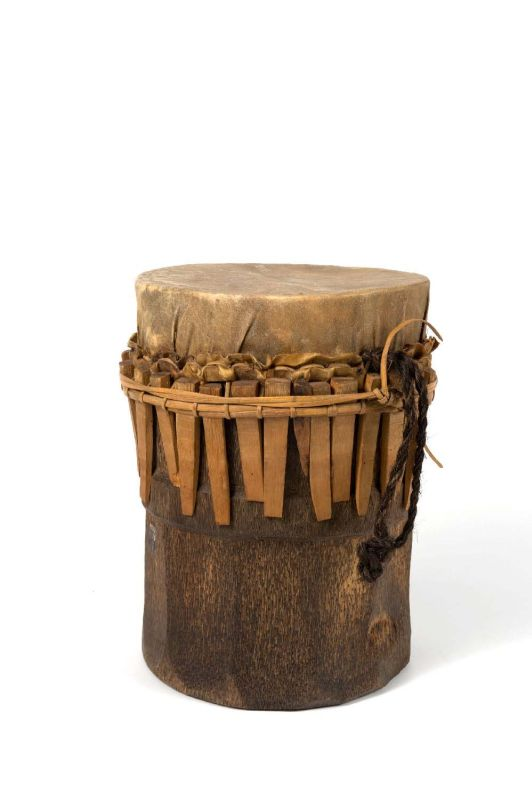
Maluku Islands, Indonesia. Tifa drum (also tiwa and tiva).

== See also ==
- Music of Papua New Guinea
- Hand drums
- New Guinean Garamut drums (German Language Wikipedia Article)
