= Tifa (drum) =

Indonesian traditional drum musical instruments

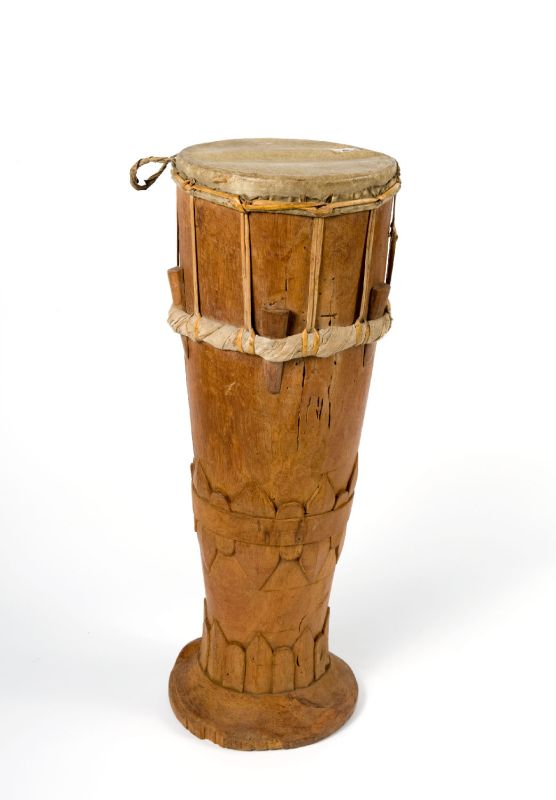
- Tifa Tiwa or Tiva; Kai Islands, before 1915

Percussion instrument
- Other names: Tiwa, Tiva
- Classification: Membranophone
- Hornbostel–Sachs classification: 211.221 211.231 211.251 (211.221 Instruments in which the body is barrel-shaped (barrel drums) and which have only one usable membrane 211.231 Instruments in which the body is hourglass-shaped and which have only one usable membrane 211.251 Instruments in which the body is goblet-shaped (goblet drums) and which have only one usable membrane)
- Developed: Developed in prehistory in Indonesian Maluku Islands and in New Guinea

The tifa, tiwa or tiva is a single-headed goblet drum used throughout the Maluku Islands of Eastern Indonesia, where it is traditionally the "dominant instrument" in Maluku province music. The term tifa has been used outside of the Maluku Islands, including on the island of Java and on the island of New Guinea, in Indonesia's Papuan provinces.

Where the Maluku-tradition tifas tend to be unadorned or plain, the Papua-tradition tifas tend to be decorated with patterns and symbols, which may be ethnic or spiritual in nature.

== Forms ==
With two overall traditions, Papuan and Maluku, there are two basic forms for the tifa drums. Papua hourglass drums tend to be more slender and often have a handle. They are played with the empty hand. Some of them are made from lenggua wood ("thick and strong".) The drumhead can be made from variety of skins, such as deerhide, lizard skin, goat hide, stingray skin, or magewang skin.

The Maluku tifa is more of a tubular drum without a handle. It varies in size, and may use a woven rattan rope with badeng pegs to tension the drumhead, which is made of goat skin. It may be played with empty hands or from a drumstick made from sago palm fronds, coconut fronds, rattan or gaba-gaba (sections of long sago palms 60–100 cm long).

=== Maluku tradition, drums with heads attached with rattan harness ===
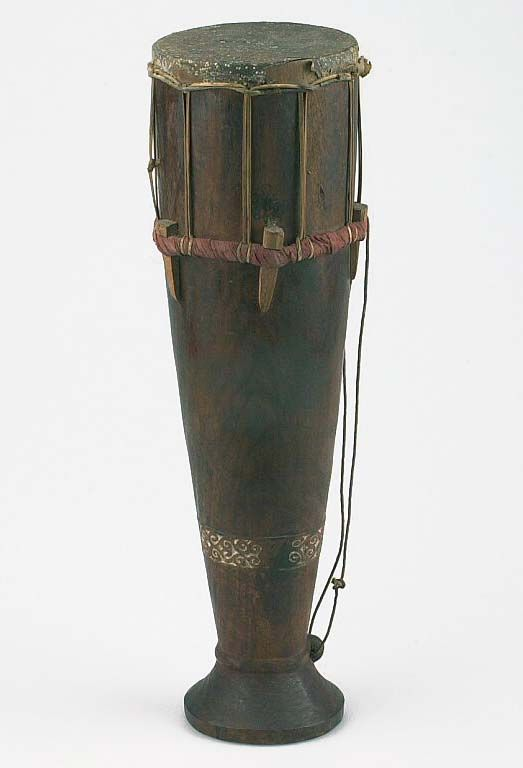
Tifa, Tanimbar Islands; the drum can be worn around the neck by means of a rattan band.

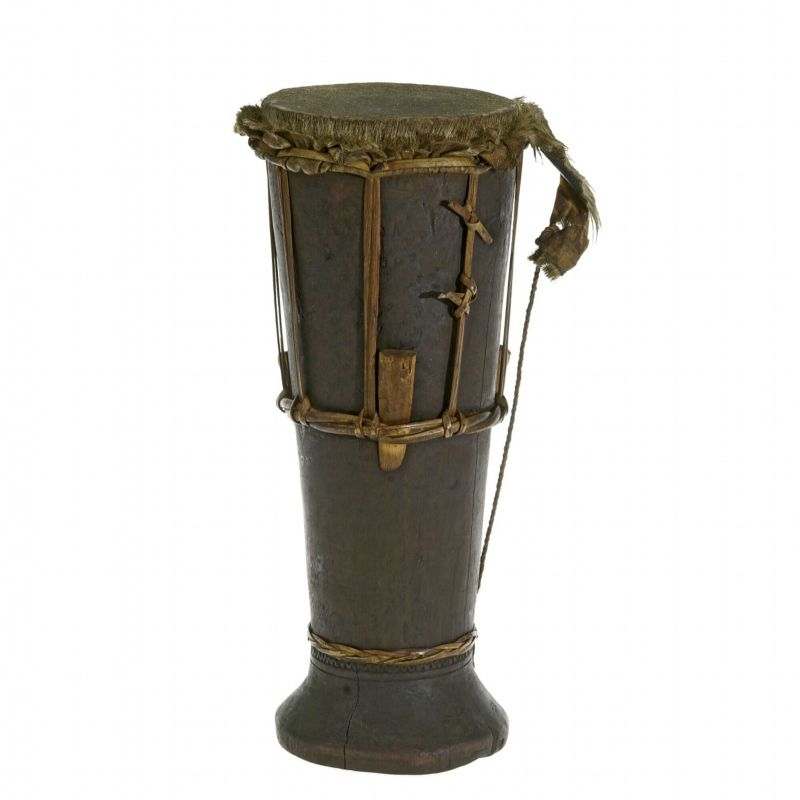
Tifa, Leti Islands

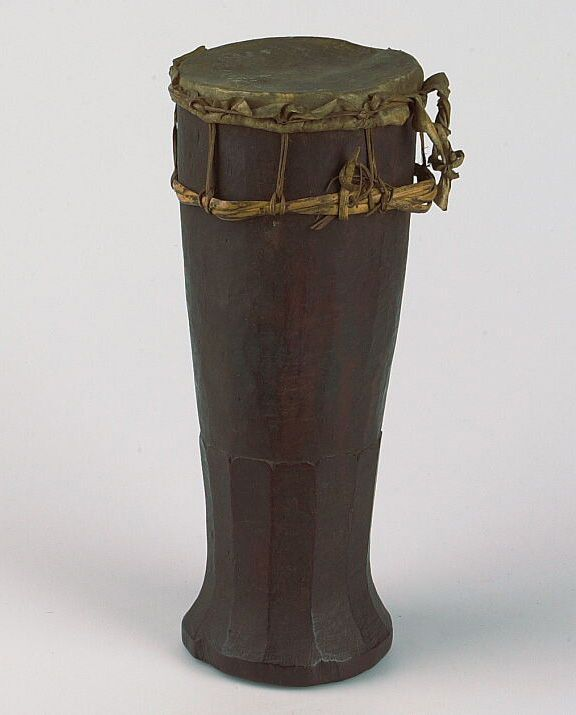
Tiwa or Tiva from the Kai Islands, Indonesia

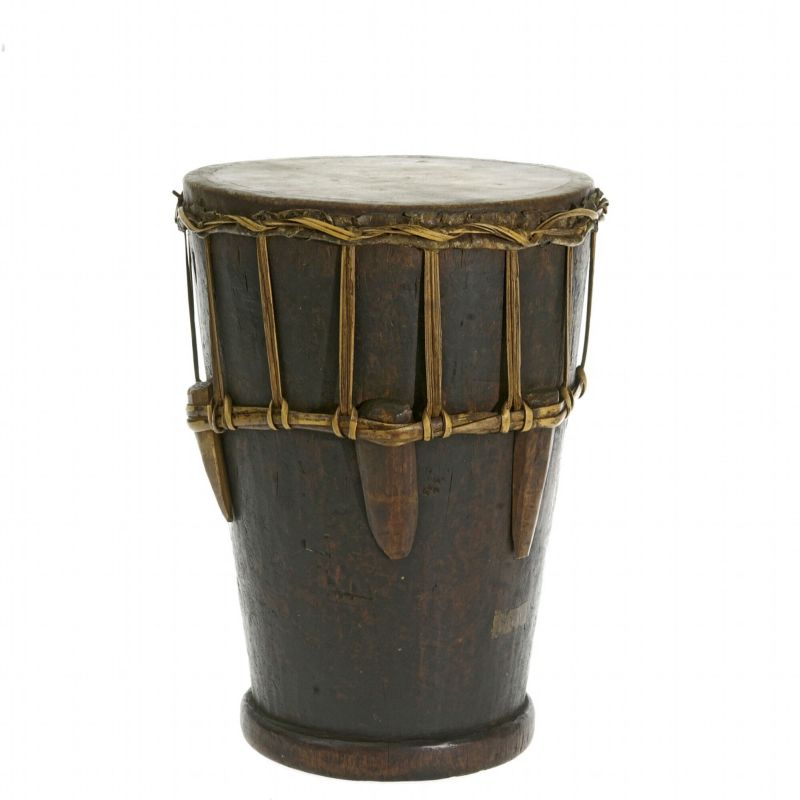
Tiwah

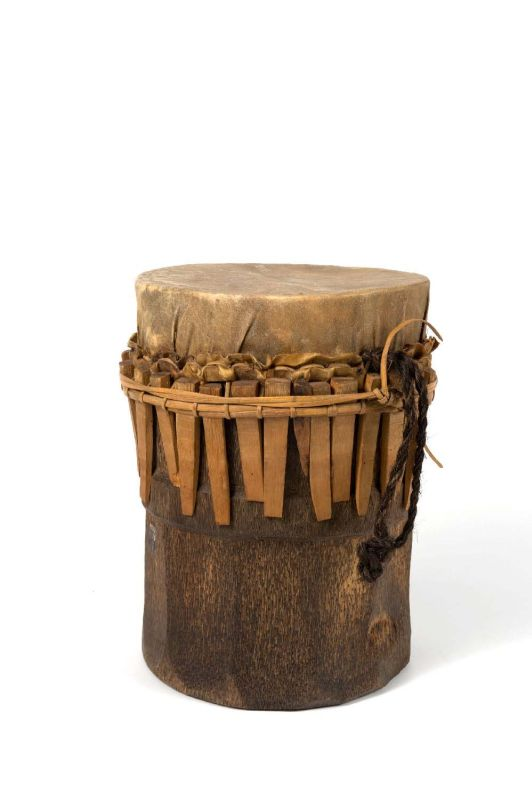
Tiwa, or tiva / tifa, from the Kai Islands

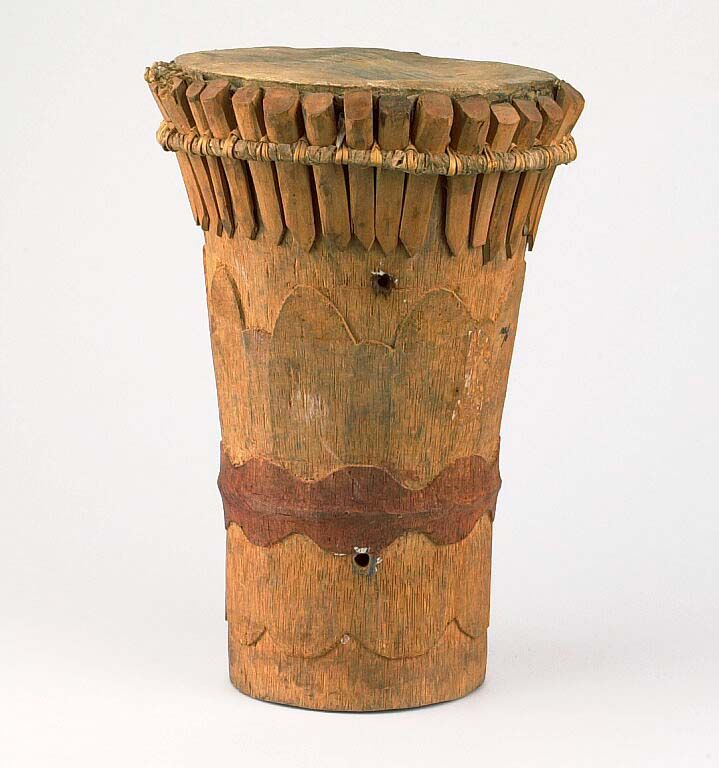
Tifa, Tidore

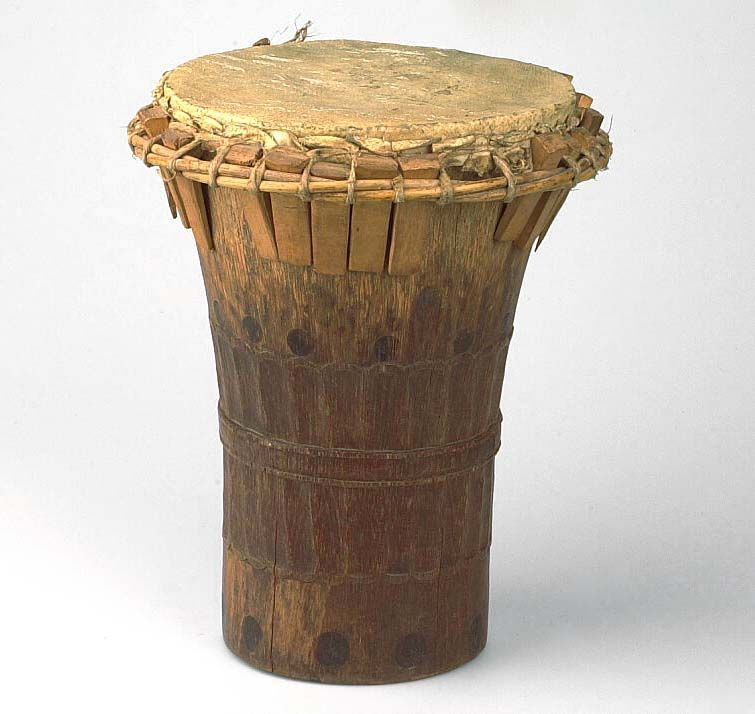
Tifa, Halmahera

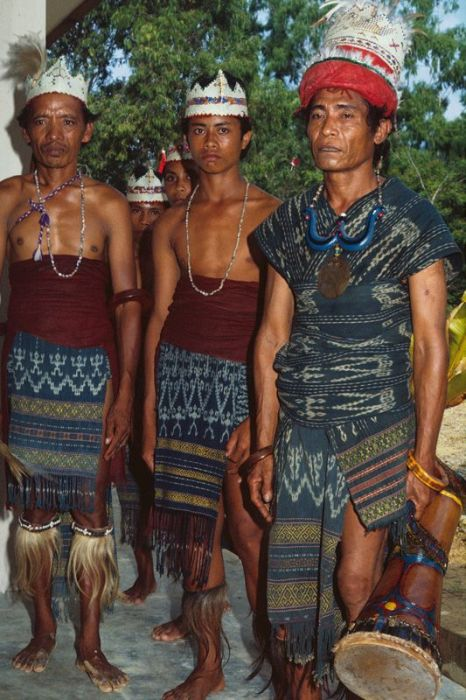
Men at Kota Ambon

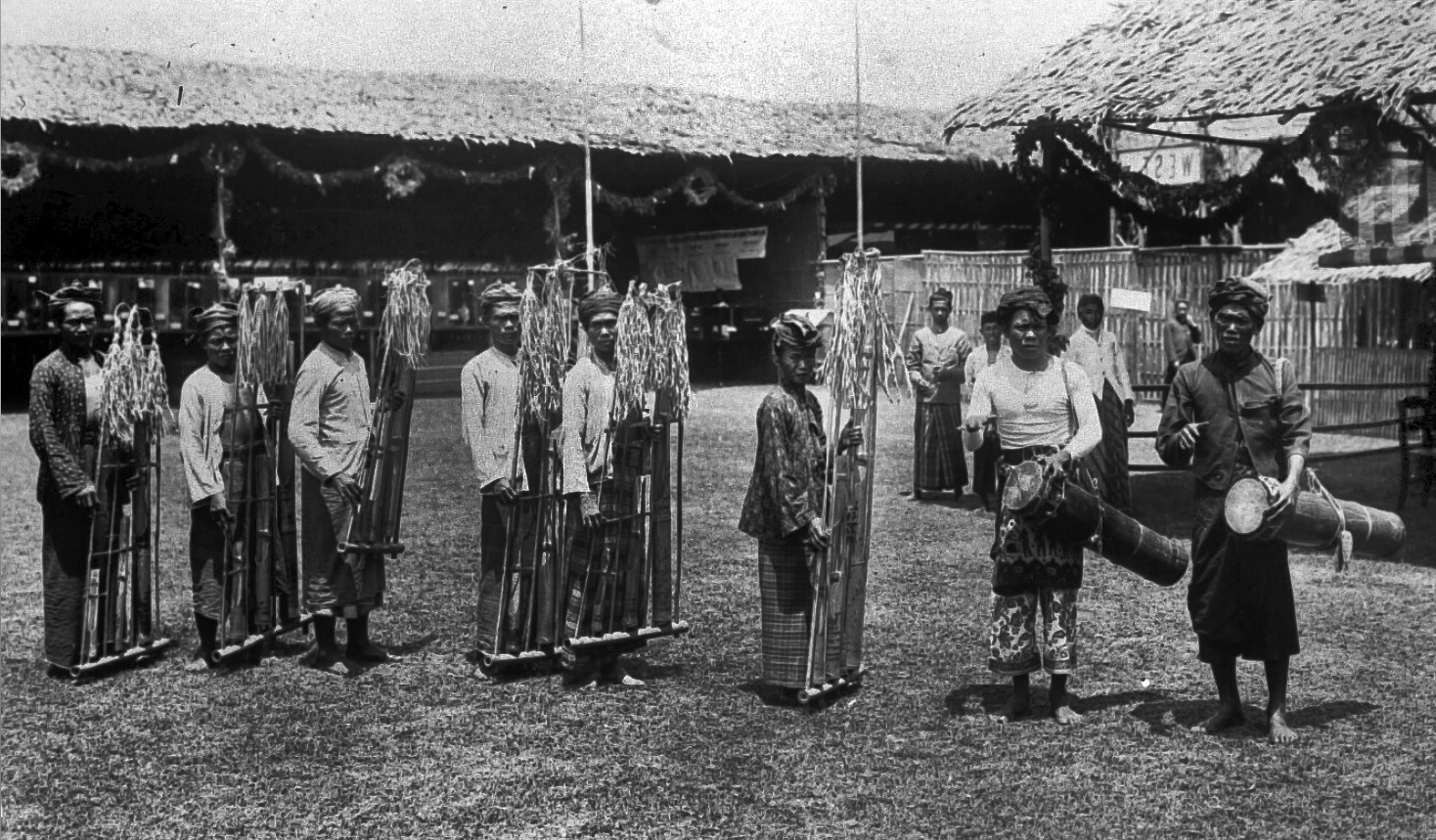
Angklungs and tifas at a fair or celebration in Batavia on Java

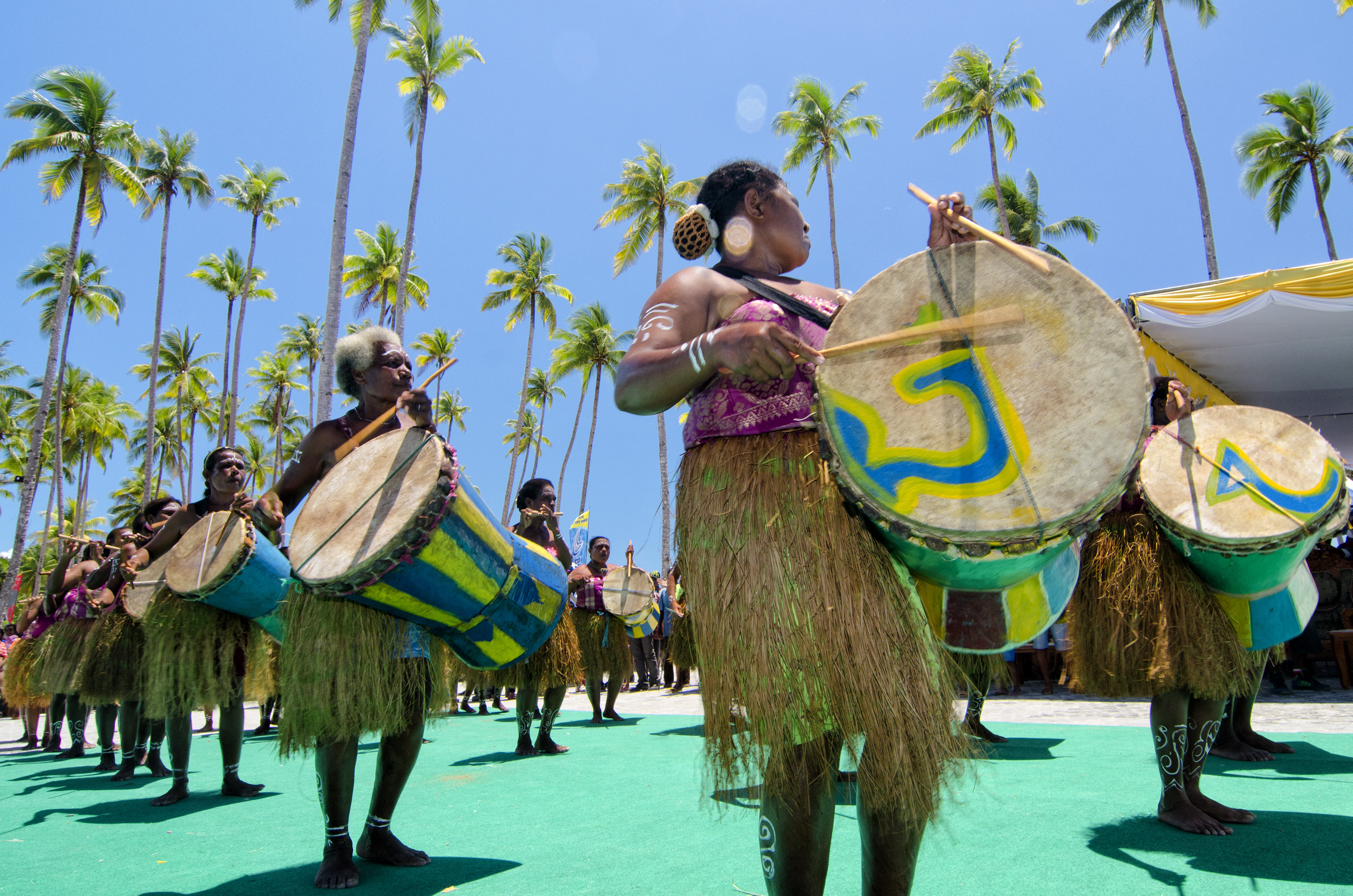
Tambur drum being played with a suling flute (center) in a Suling Tambur (flute-drum) combination in the Raja Ampat Islands

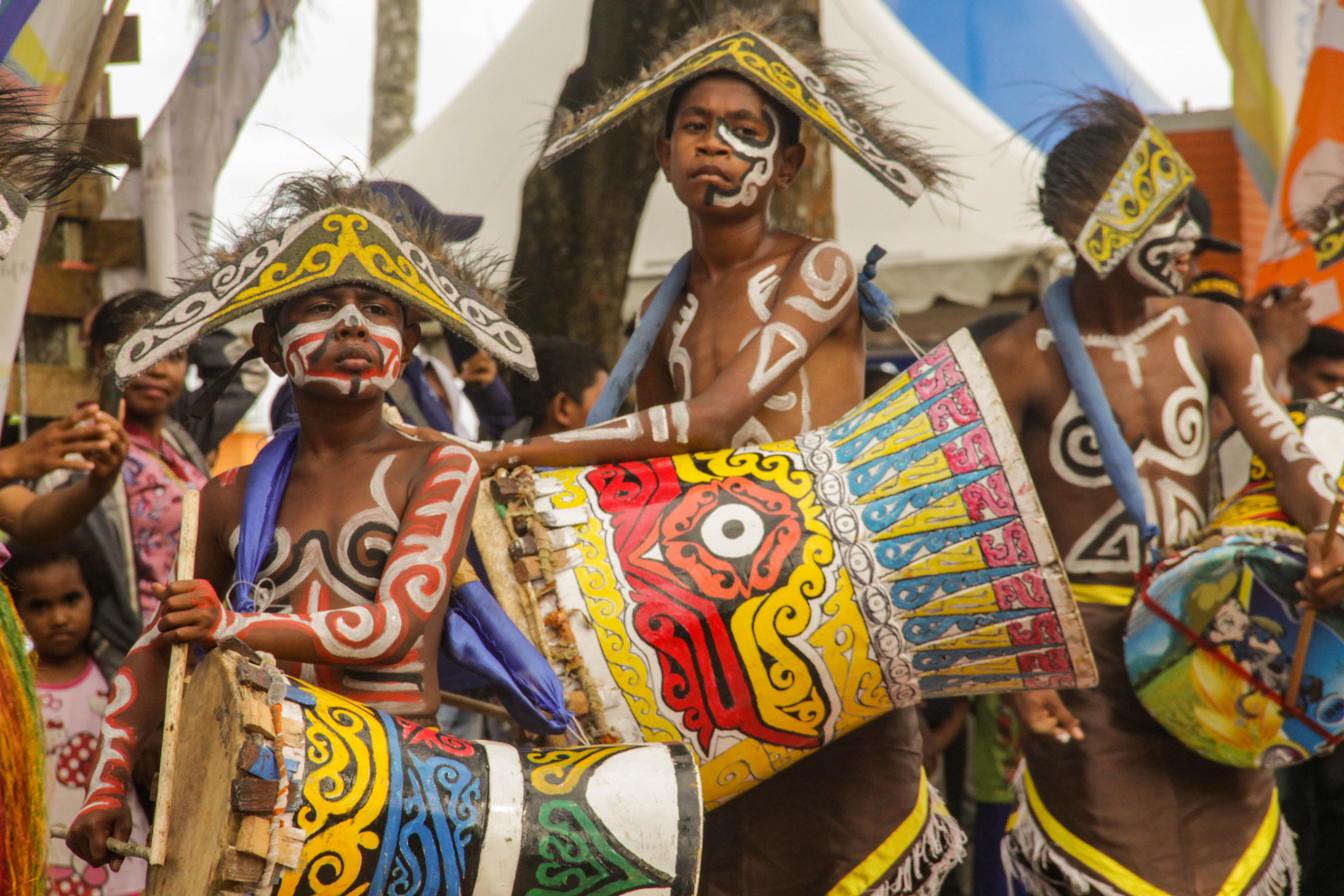
Tambur drum being played in a Suling Tambur combination at a Sing-sing

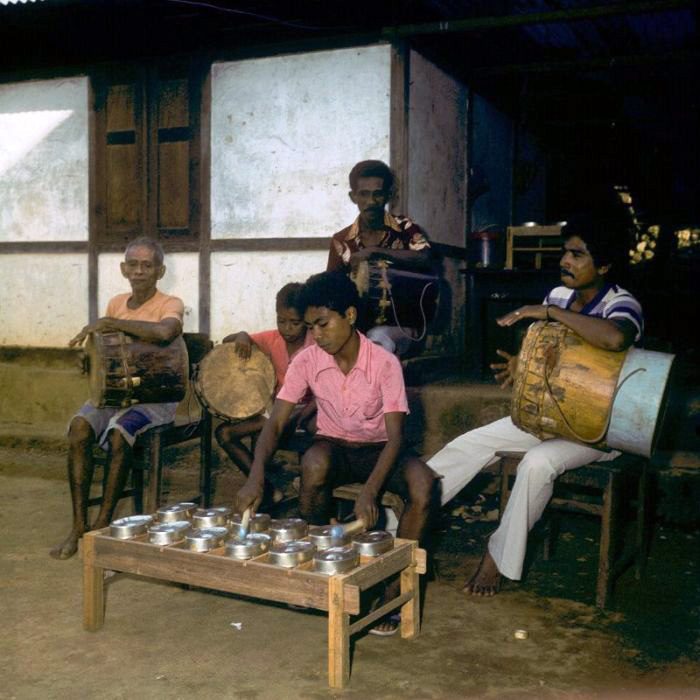
Tifa drums being played with totobuang gong chimes, in a tifa totobuang combination

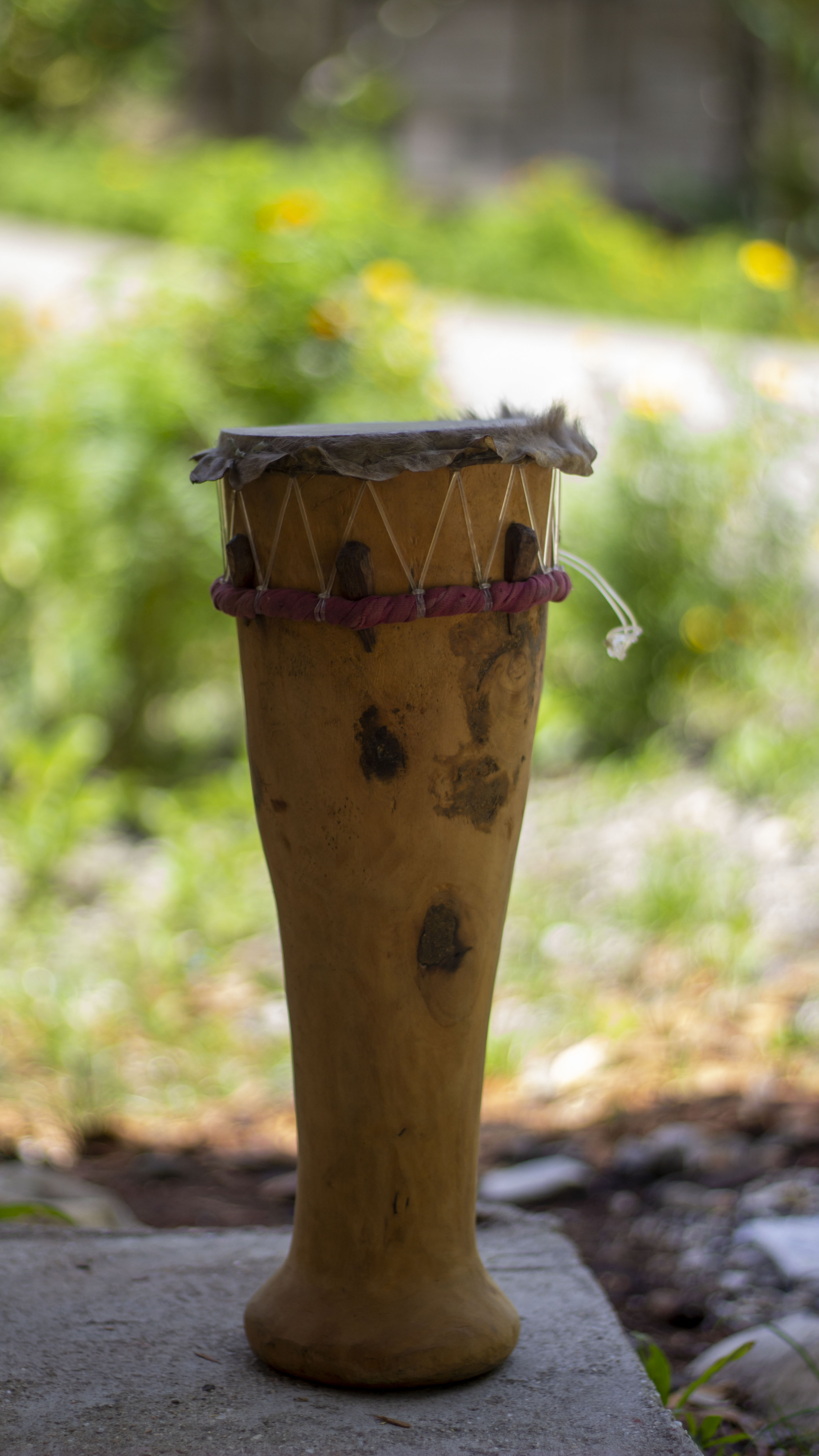
Tummour or Tumyour belonging to Mbaham-Matta people of Fakfak

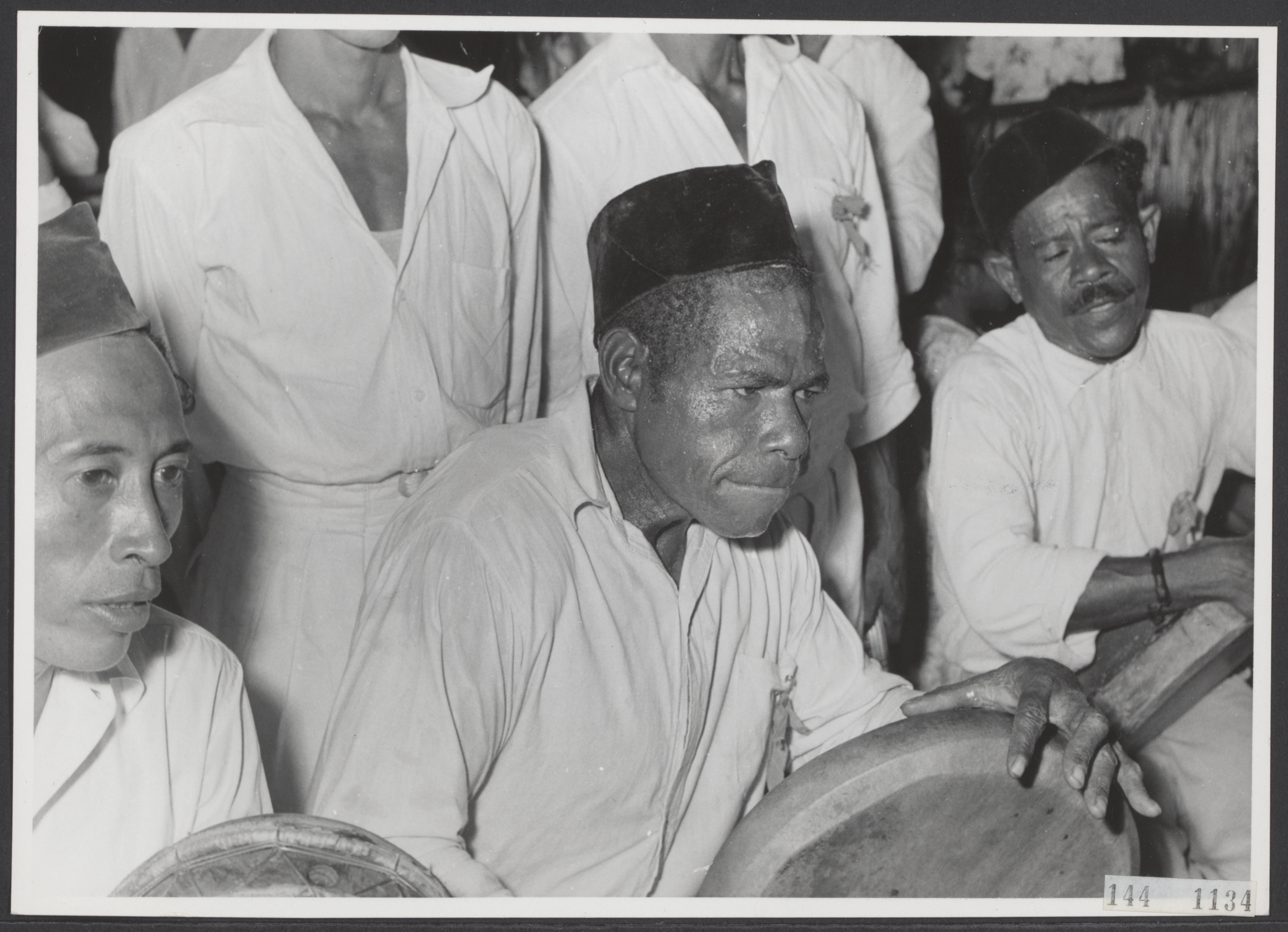
Tifa Sawat band from Waigama, Misool Island

=== Papua tradition: hourglass drums with heads glued on ===
See Kundu (drum)

Hourglass drums with glued on drumheads. Where the tifas with heads attached by rattan are associated with the Maluku Islands, these drums are associated with New Guinea and nearby islands. Related to the Papua New Guinean kundu. To the extent which the New Guinea instruments are close to the kundu, they also fall within Melanesian musical tradition.

One Papua tifa that uses rattan on the drumhead is the hourglass drum made by the Asmat people. The Asmat glue down the drumhead, then slip a tight fitting ring of rattan over the edges to keep the glued edge of the skin head in place. Traditionally, the lizard skin was held in place with a layer of human blood (as glue).

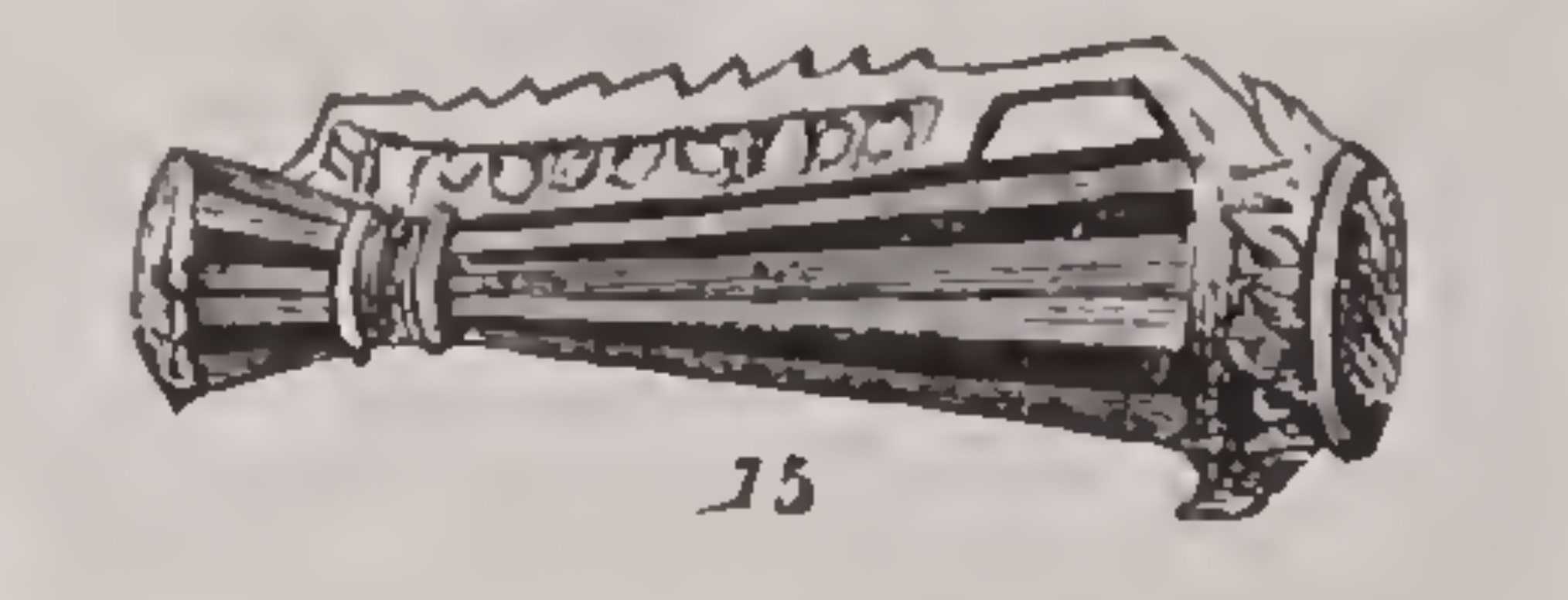
"Tifa" drum from Manokwari (then called Dorei or Doreh), 1885

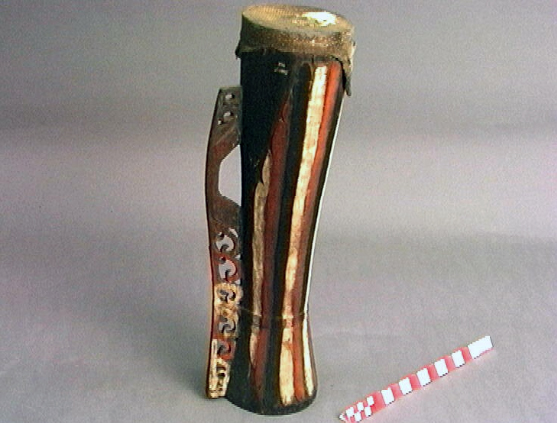
Tifa, Geelvink Bay cultures, Cenderawasih Bay, before 1883

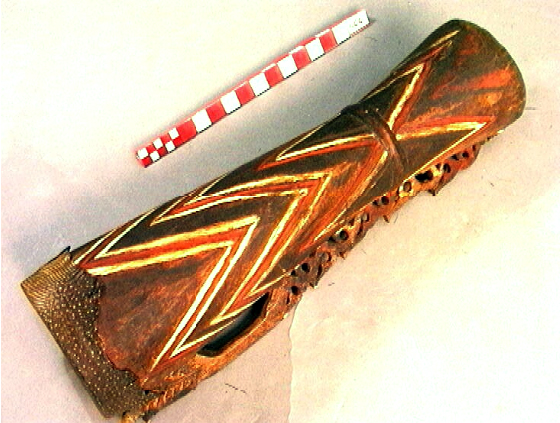
Tifa drum, Cenderawasih Bay, Geelvink culture

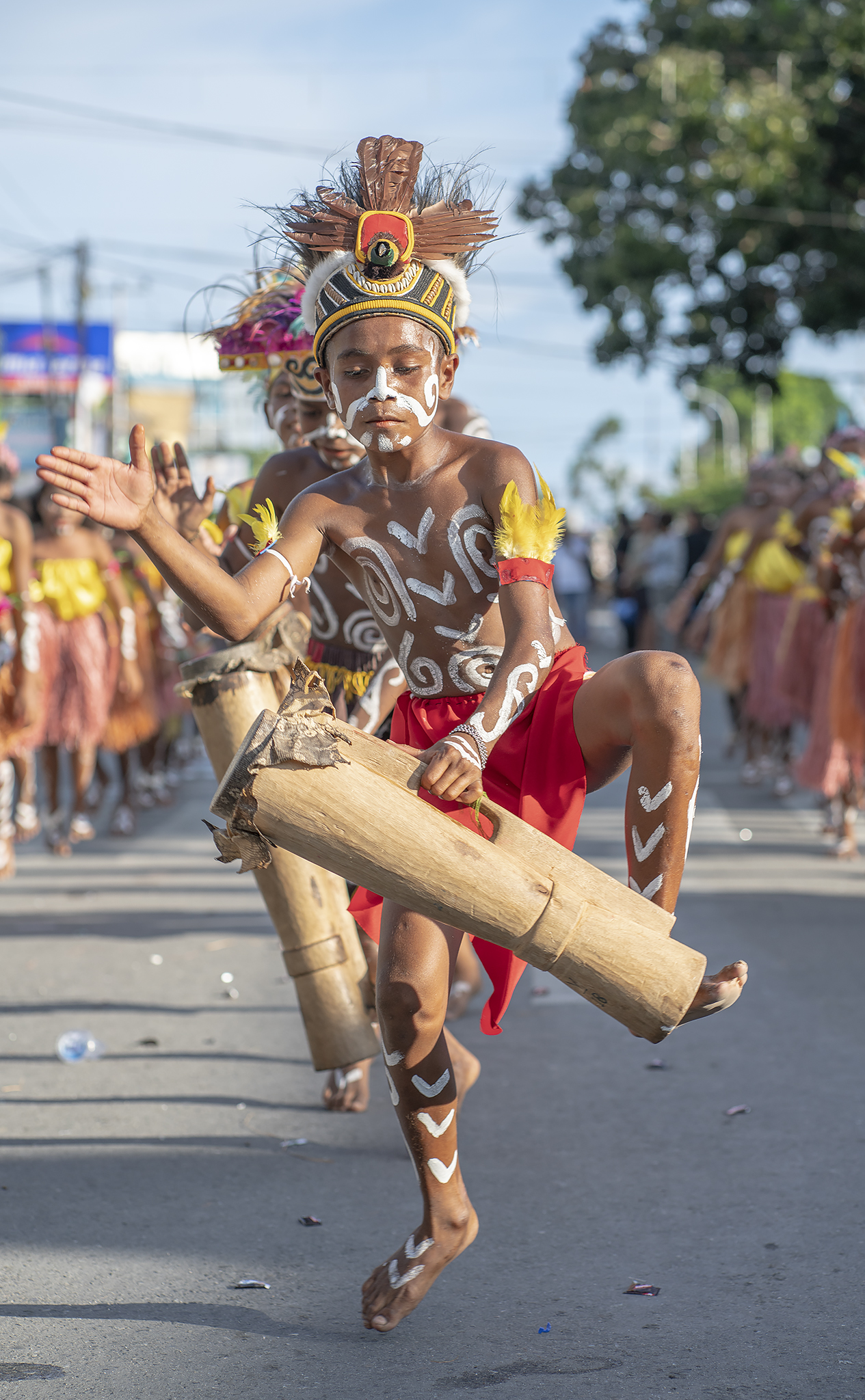
Dancer with tifa, Biak

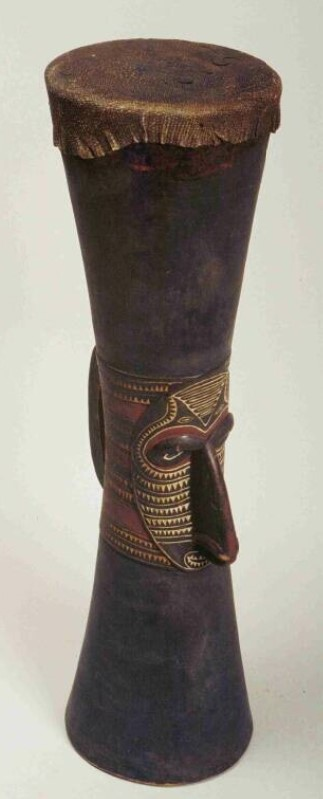
Tifa drum, Yabim people, Huon Peninsula, Papua New Guinea. Although labeled Tifa in the museum, this drum comes from Eastern Papua New Guinea, where there is a carved kundu-drum tradition.

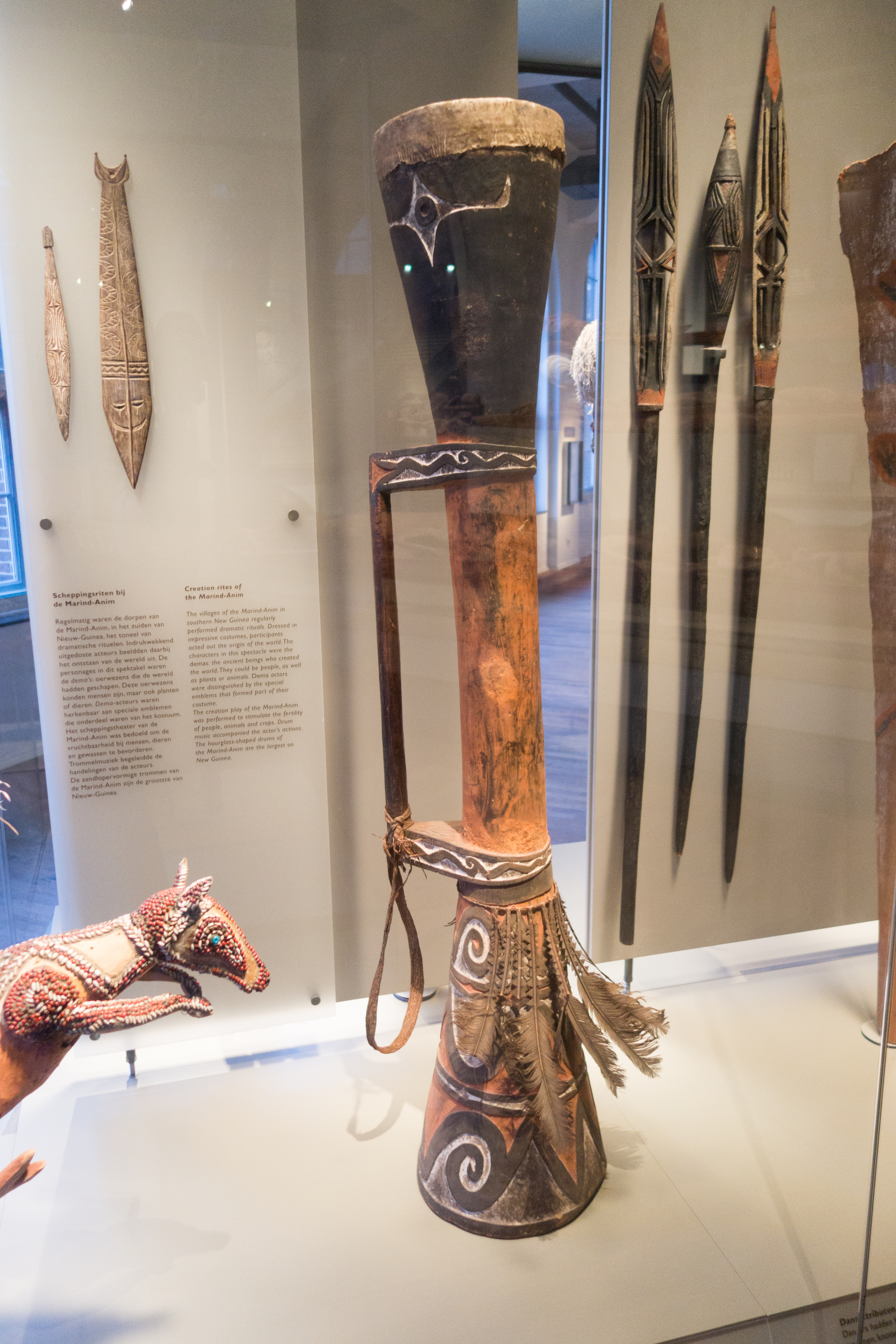
Kandara, "tifa" drum from Marind-Anim

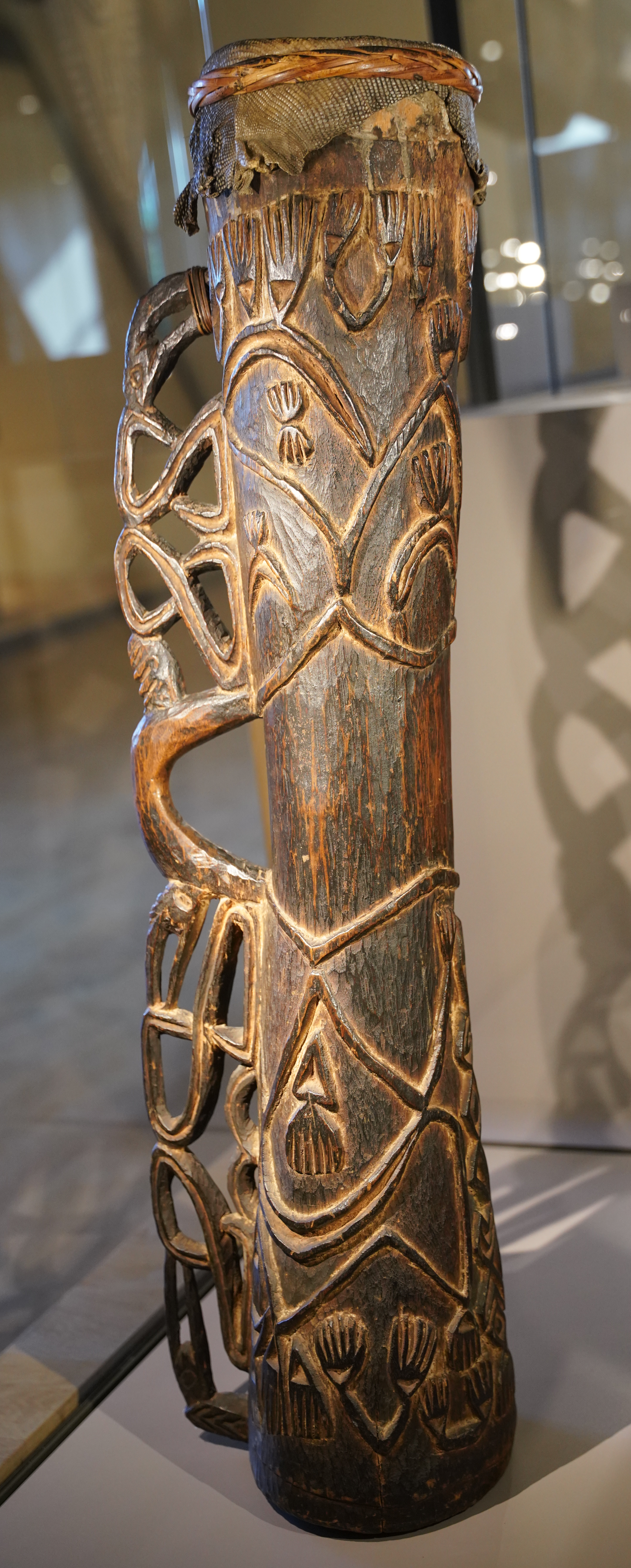
Eme, Asmat's drum, is labelled kendu and tambour as well

== Customs ==
The tifa has traditionally been played by men, and this custom has resisted modern attitudes of equality between men and women. Adherence to gender roles is seen as a way to honor ancestors. In rural communities, older values dictate the role of the male musician is to be a leader. His role is to "play ritual music," the rituals of which are seen as a "cultural and hereditary heritage from their ancestors." When played for ritual use, the community procedures dictate getting permission to play.

The Maluku tifa is used to accompany "traditional ceremonies, traditional dances and war dances," including the Cakalele dance. The Cakalele dance recalls the "atmosphere of war in ancient Maluku society." The Maluku tifa is also combined with totobuang gong chimes to form a tifa totobuang ensemble to accompany Maluku Island's Sawat Lenso dance. The Sawat Lenso joins a form or instrumental ensemble called Lenso used by Christians with Sawat music and dance brought by Muslims.

In Papua, one occasion to play the tifas is a Sing-sing, a gathering of a few tribes or villages in Papua New Guinea. People arrive to show their distinct culture, dance and music. The aim of these gatherings is to peacefully share traditions as each Islands have their own dance. Villagers paint and decorate themselves for sing-sings which they only have once a year. The male-exclusive role of drummers has been relaxed in some places, such as Raja Ampat Islands, where photos show women playing the Maluku-style tifas in suling tambur (flute drum) ensembles. (See gallery, Maluku traditions.) Furthermore similar to the Moluccas, regions in West Papua such as the Kokoda people of South Sorong also have Sawat musical tradition in the form of tifa syawat which was a type of tetabuhan, introduced from Kokas in Fakfak, consisting of tifa, gong, adrat, suling, to accompany Kasuari dance, weddings, Mauludan and other events.

== Names ==
In Papua the tifa is called eme by the Asmat people, kalin kla in Teminabuan, wachu in Sentani, sirep, sandio or tambur (for the larger drum) in Biak, kandara among the Marind people, and tummour or titir (for the larger drum) among the Mbaham-Matta people of Fakfak.

Closer to Maluku, the tifa drums are called tifa; in central Maluku there is the tihal or tahito and on the island of Aru it is called the titir.

== See also ==
- Kundu (drum), the drum from Papua New Guinea
- Tifa, article on Indonesian Wikipedia
