= Sacred flute music of Papua New Guinea =

Musical and ceremonial practice in Papua New Guinea

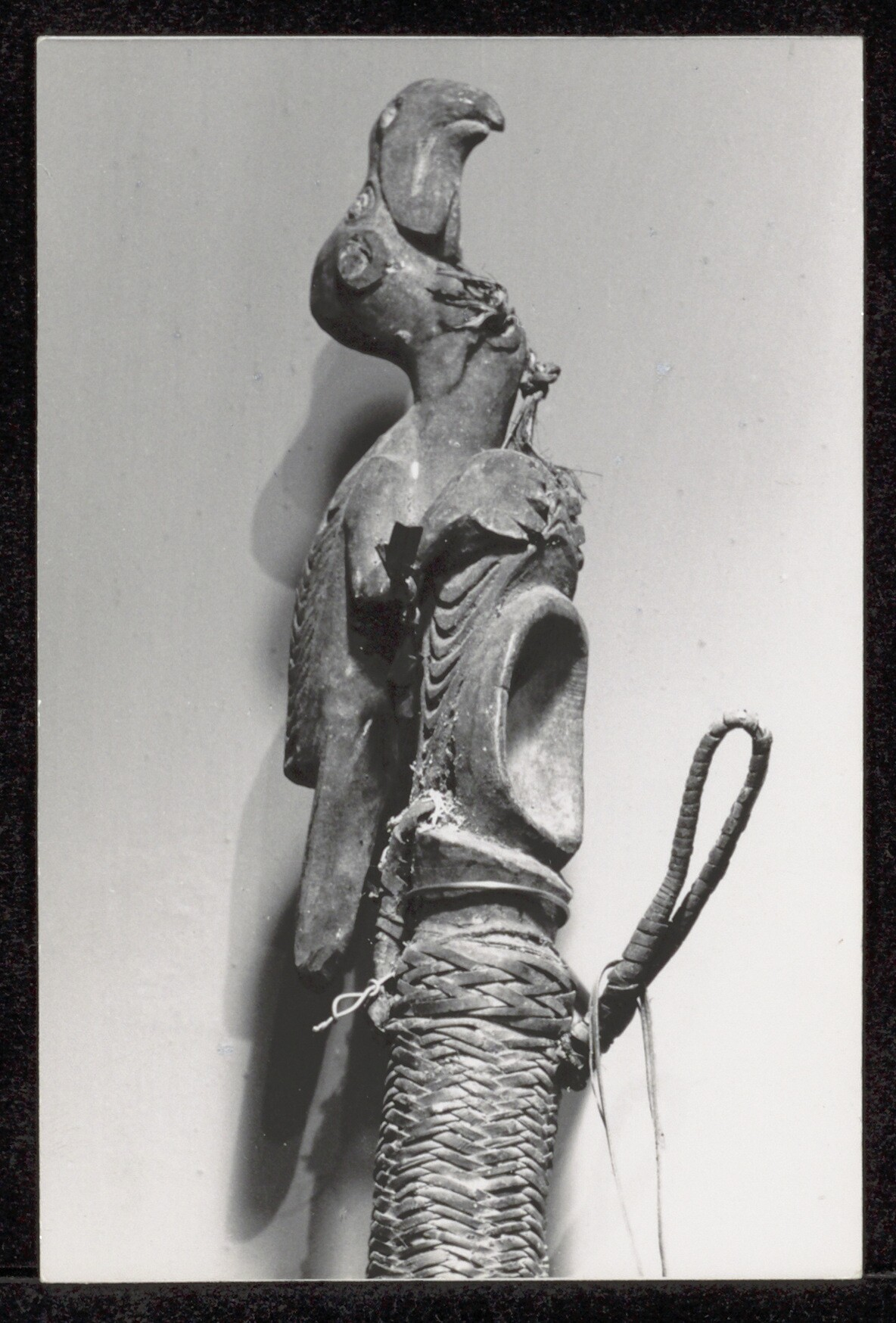
A Papuan sacred flute with a carved bird figure depicted at one of its ends.

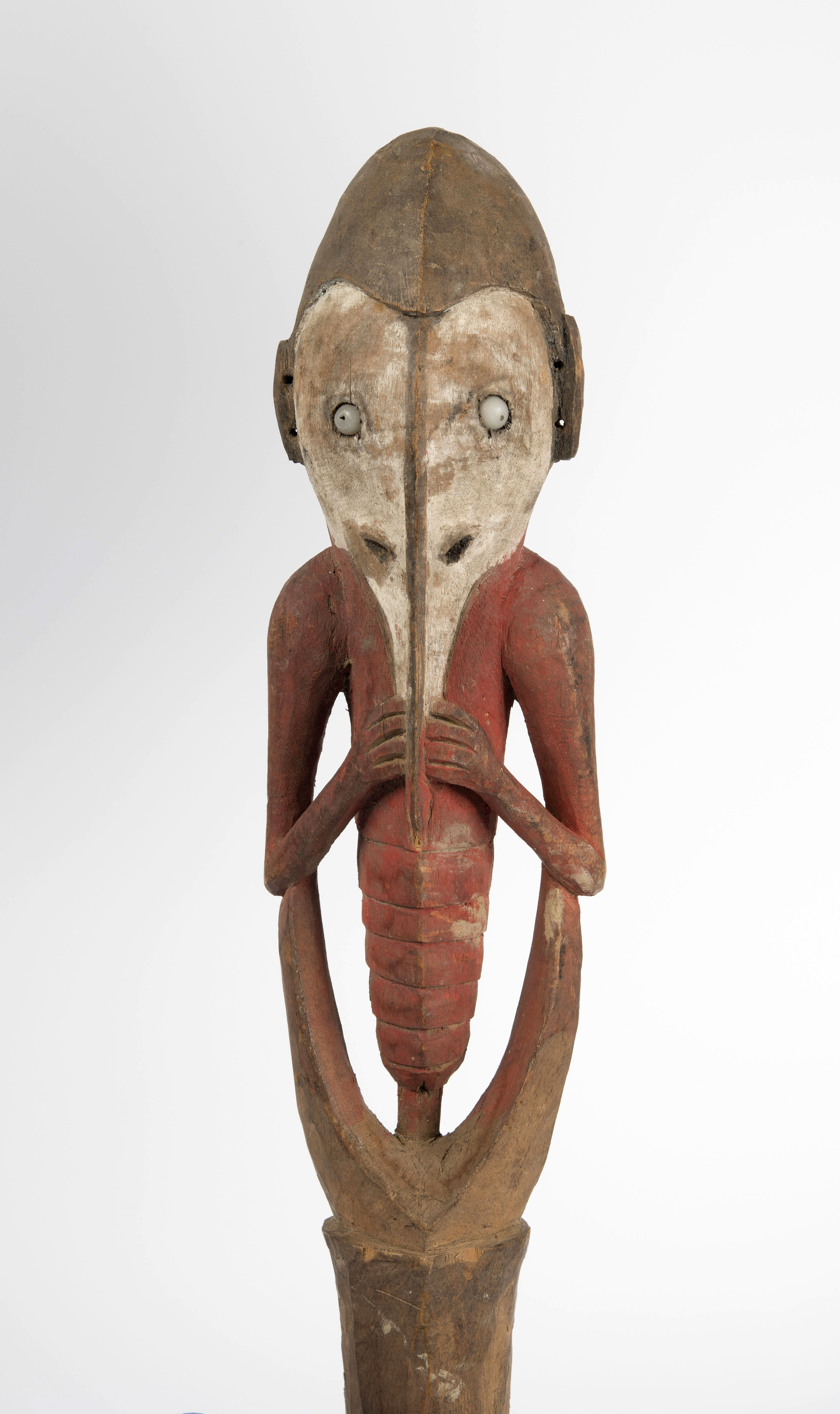
Iatmul carved flute stopper depicting an insect figure (likely a cicada) holding its nose, which symbolizes a flute. This flute was played during a boys' initiation ritual.

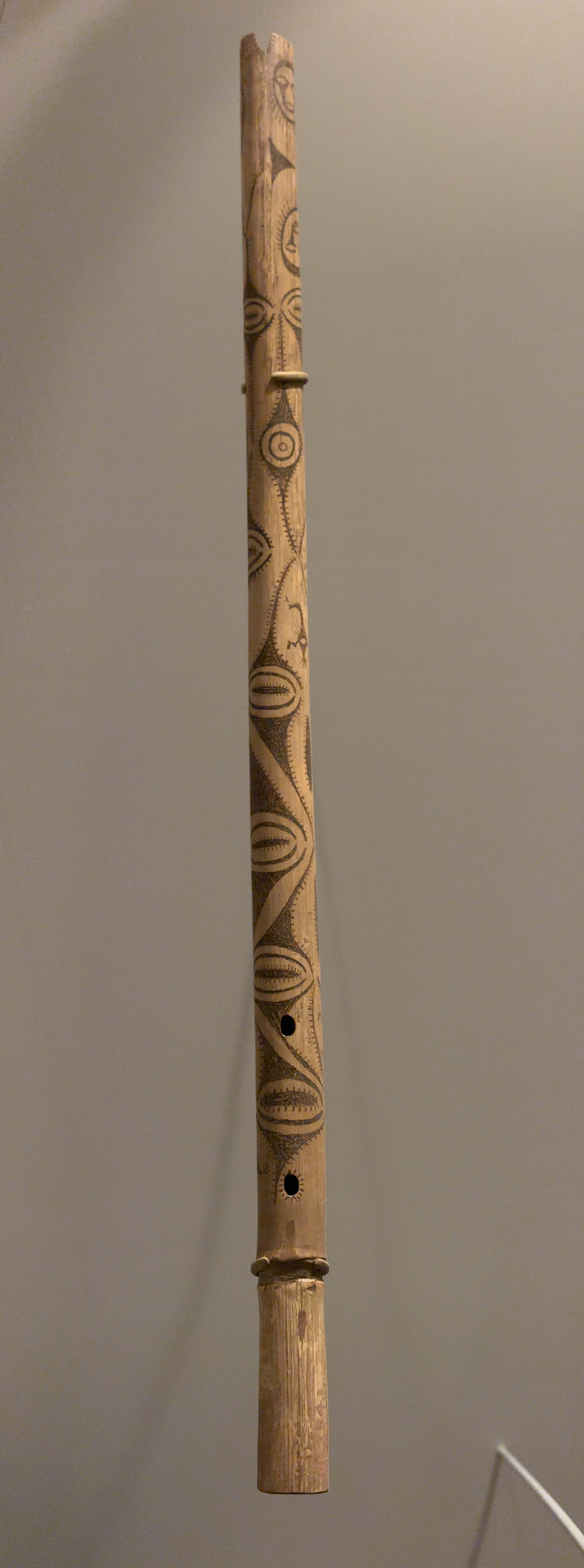
Carved bamboo sacred flute from the Tolei people of the Gazelle Peninsula with detailed engravings, which expressed a spirit type called "brag" when played.

The sacred flute music of Papua New Guinea is a polyphonic tradition from the island country of Papua New Guinea. The playing of bamboo flutes during important events and ceremonies, as a representation of spirit voices or a method of invoking spirits in a ritual context, was traditionally kept secretive and often restricted to men, although women and children are now permitted to witness their playing. The sacred flutes are played during birth ceremonies, initiation ceremonies, marriage preparations, and "pig festivals," and are used throughout the region by different ethnic groups with slight variations in practice.

== Origin ==
Sacred flute traditions in Papua New Guinea likely originated on the island of New Guinea, specifically from the Kakihan society of Ceram in the Moluccas. The practice is thought by Swiss anthropologist Paul Wirz to have traveled along the rivers Juat and Jimmi, spreading to the Sepik area and eventually reaching the Highlands region.

The widespread origin myth of the sacred flutes is heavily influenced by cultural attitudes toward gender and by power structures in village society. According to Papua New Guinea Highland mythology, women were the original “producers and owners” of the sacred flutes during a purported past time when Highland society was strictly matriarchal. Men, according to the myth, would show reverence when the flutes were played by women, and would bow their bodies to show "submission" to the sacred flutes. At a certain point during this period of matriarchal political dominance, men stole the flutes back and subverted the power dynamic, exerting supremacy over women who were now forced into exile from sacred flute practice and were from this point onward not allowed to witness flute-playing by the men. Anthropologist Gillian Gillison recorded a more detailed origin mythology of the men’s theft of sacred flutes, as told by the Gimi ethnic group of the Eastern Highlands:

“A man heard strange sounds coming from his sister’s ‘flute house’ (the Gimi word for ‘menstrual hut’). He hid nearby in the tall grass and, when she went to her garden he crept inside the hut and stole the flute that was lying at the head of her bed. When he put the instrument to his lips to play, he grew a beard for the first time. He had not noticed that the flute’s blowing hole was closed, plugged up with his sister’s pubic hair which, when he touched it, began to grow around his mouth. He removed the hairy plug and began to make sounds. When his sister returned from the garden, he told her: ‘You must give me the thing that cries. You are not a man, but a woman. You can give it to me.’ She did and forgot everything that happened and died. ‘So, today,’ men say, ’whenever we play (the flutes inside the men’s house) women think: “I wonder what this is - some strange bird perhaps - hiding inside the men’s house and crying?” … But, to tell the truth, it was once something that belonged only to women. It was not ours! We men stole it!’”

== Ritual use ==
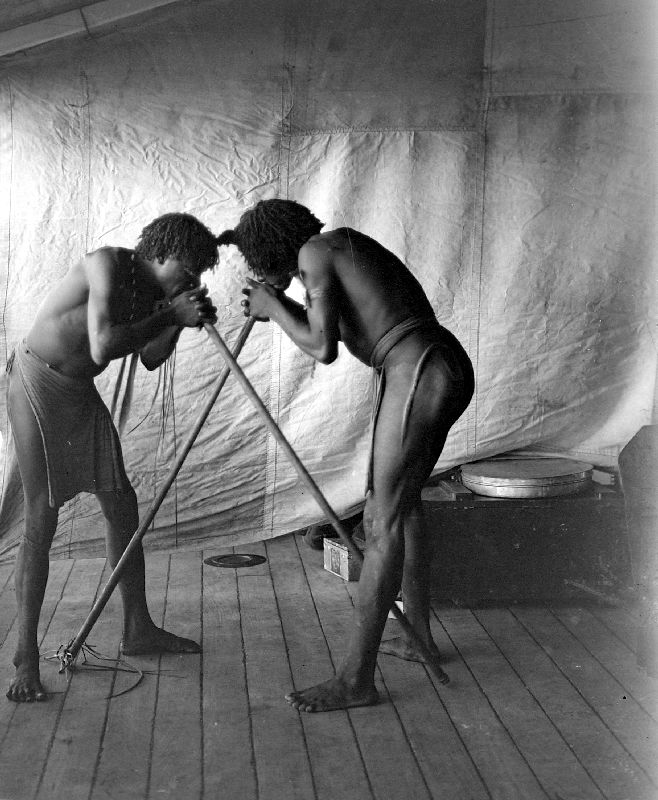
Two Papuan men blow on sacred flutes while facing each other, c. 1903

The playing of sacred flutes is an essential facet of Papuan initiation ceremonies. These ceremonies are even referred to as "seeing the flute" by participants, and the presentation of the flutes during the ceremony signals the boys's official entrance into societal membership. For the Ommura, these male initiation ceremonies are referred to as ummara and iyavati. After the ceremony the flutes would be either broken and thrown away or kept in a secret location, most likely a men's communal hut to maintain secrecy. This secrecy was an integral part of sacred flute performance, and only certain members of society, usually adult men, would be permitted to play the flutes or to witness them being played. Lessons were also traditionally given to male initiates in secrecy, and would take place in a far away bush area to avoid anyone hearing the flutes.

Sacred flutes are also played during "pig festivals" (which are generally found throughout the central highlands) and fertility ceremonies. The sacred flutes are integral to certain regional iterations of the "pig festival," and in the Goroka region the local name for the pig festival is "pig-flute(bird)." These pig festivals, which were held at intervals of several years, were announced by the playing of sacred flutes after a decision was made to hold one. Sacred flutes would also be blown every night in preparation for the festival, which encompassed crop production and pig breeding. According to American anthropologist Terrence Eugene Hays, this nightly flute blowing was used as a tactic to intimidate the women of the village and to assert power by the men. During the festival, hundreds of pigs are traditionally slaughtered for distribution and the flutes are played leading up to this distribution. The month of preparation required for a "pig festival" would also often be used as a period of time to hold male initiation ceremonies.

A 1920 account of ceremonies in Papua New Guinea describes the ritual use of sacred flutes at a circumcision ceremony and at the "circumcision feast" of the Yabim and "Bakaua" groups. In this ritual, the sacred flutes are sounded alongside the bullroarer during the act of circumcision while the initiates are inside the balum hut, which is specifically constructed for use in the circumcision ritual, and is meant to represent a "monster" that will swallow the initiates.

== Gender and sexual symbology ==
A 1934 ethnography of Manam reports that there are generally two sacred flutes kept in each village which are characterized by gender, one considered male and one considered female. These flutes are referred to with one name per dyad, which is unique for every village. There are also cases where flute pairs will represent different gendered combinations and not be referred to exclusively as male-female, however it remains consistent that flute pairs in the Highlands region are almost always given sex attributions of some kind.

Norms surrounding the sacred flutes are characterized by a fear among men that the secret of the sacred flutes might be revealed in various ways to women, who may then use this knowledge to regain political and social dominance. For example, women of the Gimi people are not permitted to make cooking materials with the same bamboo stock used to make sacred flutes, “lest they dream of flutes after eating food cooked in such tubes and reveal the men’s secret to other women.” The anthropologist Kenneth E. Read recounts an interaction with a man from the Gahuku of the Eastern Highlands on the relationship between sacred flutes and sexuality:

“Hunehune’s eyes were bright with feeling. His voice trembled perceptively, like his hand, which rested lightly on a pair of flutes, while he tried to make me understand and share the wonder of the sound we had heard. …. the effect was magical, a mystery for which he had no adequate words. Gesturing helplessly with his hands, Hunehune turned to Bihore and remarked that his playing had so deranged him that if he had been a woman he would have had to come to Bihore’s house. There was no mistaking the implication of his words, the attribution of sexual qualities to the nama (flutes).”

In another example, the Simbari tribal group suggests a sexual relationship between men and a flute spirit who is referred to as “frog female” or namboolu aambelu, whom they say calls men her “intimates.” A Simbari myth describes a spirit woman named “Numambi”, who is the men’s collective “secret wife” living in the forest. The sounds of sacred flutes being played have also been mythically attributed to vocalizations from a middle-aged “spirit woman” victimized by group sexual violence, with the explanation that “the men were holding her and doing things with her, not good things either.”

For the Gimi, sacred flute pairs have direct genital symbology, and when played are representative of a self-contained sexual intercourse which happens within the flute. The openings on either side of the sacred flutes are considered to be two vaginas, and the wind running through the flute while it is being played represents a penis. This symbolic intercourse occurs as a representation of the fertility and "empty" nature of the bride in marriage preparations. While the man blows into the first end of the flute, the end that is not blown into, called the “second vagina,” is where the “cries of his child” are said to be produced.

== Sound and performance ==
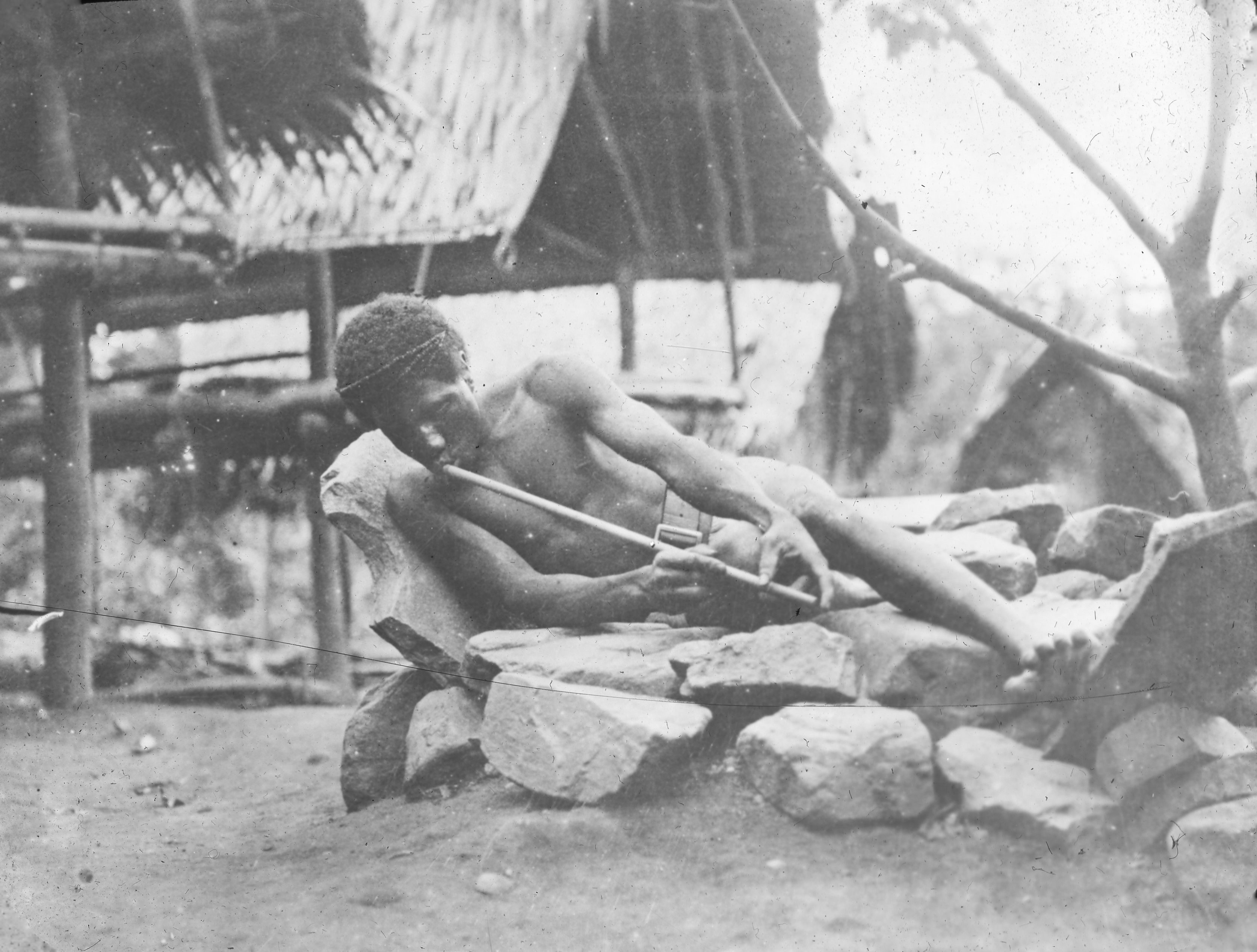
Man playing a flute in Bwaidoga, Mud Bay, Goodenough Island, c. 1920s

During performances observed in the Madang area, two men playing sacred flutes would face one another and blow through the flutes interchangeably so that constant tones are produced. Blowing into a Madang sacred flute requires lots of breath, and it is subsequently difficult to produce a tone because of their large size, usually five to six feet. The Madang sacred flutes additionally do not contain finger holes, meaning that a tone must be produced from the natural harmonic capacity of the bamboo tube, which requires lots of breath and sustained effort. British anthropologist Gregory Bateson observes of the flutes used by the Iatmol group:

“Such a flute will give seven or eight different notes scattered over about three octaves of a diatonic scale….The intervals between the notes are necessarily large so that the bamboo flute is not one which can be satisfactorily used as a solo instrument.”

Generally in the Highland tradition, the “male” flute would be sounded first in the contrapuntal performance.The tones produced from the sacred flutes are the result of the player varying their lip positions and manipulating air flow as it exits the flute.

== Current practice ==
An anthropological account from 1954 describes the "former" secrecy of the sacred flutes before the colonization of Papua New Guinea, but references their current practice as being inclusive of women and children as witnesses to their performance. The account describes the sacred flutes in current practice as being stored in the "Geru-houses," which are "visible to anyone wishing to see them," contrary to the traditional restrictions on sacred flute viewing where flutes could only be seen by men. The modernization of ritual sacred flute practice is also reported on, saying that male children are able to practice playing sacred flutes in current papuan society long before their initiation.
