= Goroka Show =

Tribal gathering and cultural event in Papua New Guinea

The Goroka Show, also the Eastern Highlands Agricultural Show, is a well-known tribal gathering and cultural event in Papua New Guinea. It is a sing-sing held every year close to the country's Independence Day (16 September) in the town of Goroka, the capital of the Eastern Highlands Province. About 100 tribes arrive to show their music, dance and culture. The festival started in 1956 as an initiative of Australian Kiaps. The first festival was attended by around 10,000 natives and by tourists from around Papua New Guinea and Australia. In recent years it has become a major attraction for both national and international tourists and remains the largest cultural event in Papua New Guinea despite similar shows now being organised in Mount Hagen and other cities around the country. The 60th anniversary show held in 2016 was reported as the largest gathering to date, with more than 120 groups attending and thousands of foreign tourists. In 2026 the 70th anniversary show will be held on 18-20 September at the National Sports Institute Field Grounds.

== See also ==
- List of festivals in Papua New Guinea
- List of folk festivals
