= Yabim people =

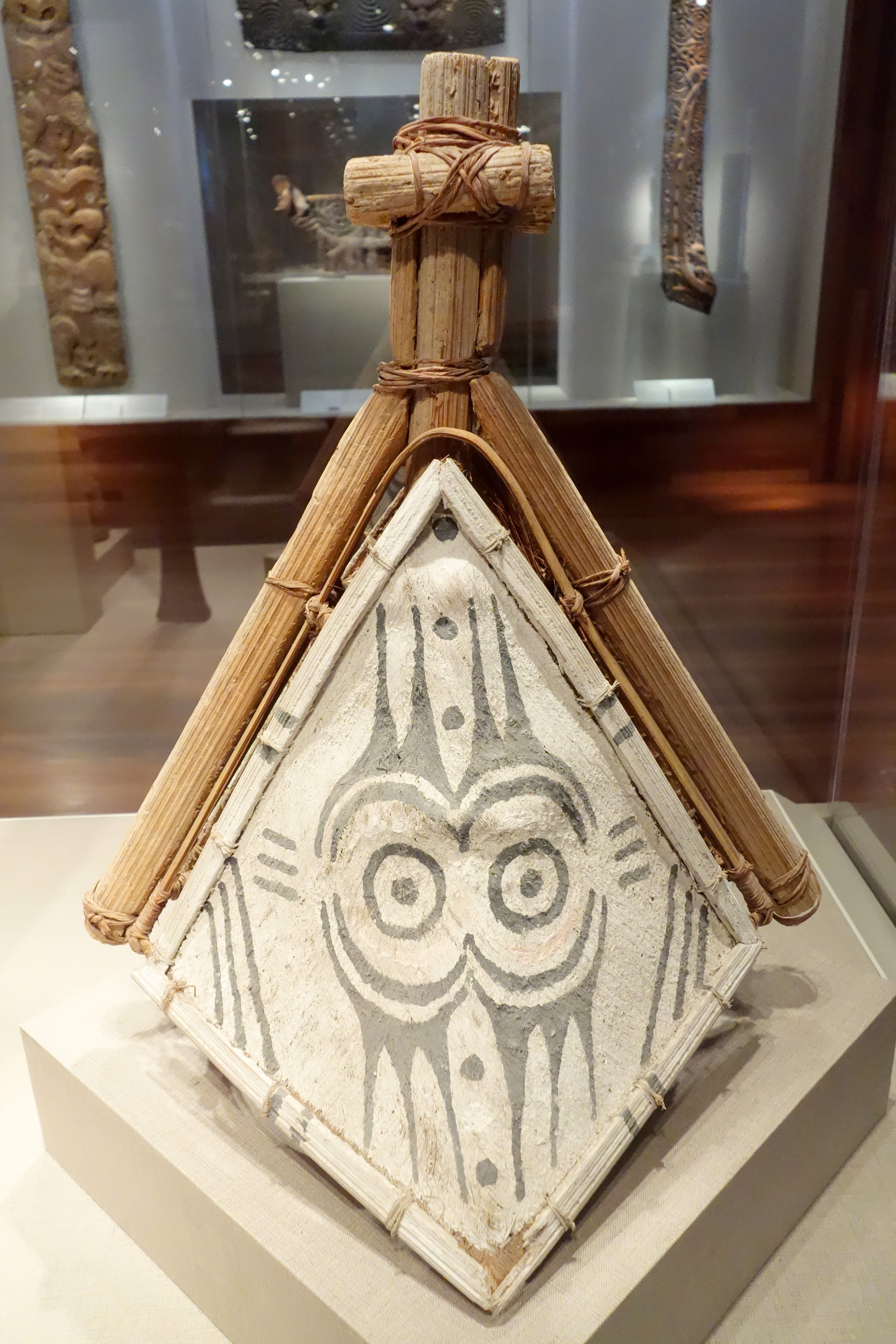
Headgear used in dance performances

Yabim, also spelled Yabem and Jabem, are a people in Papua New Guinea. They speak the Yabem language.

German missionaries visited them and wrote about them.

The North Carolina Synod of the Evangelical Lutheran Church has relations with the Yabim District.

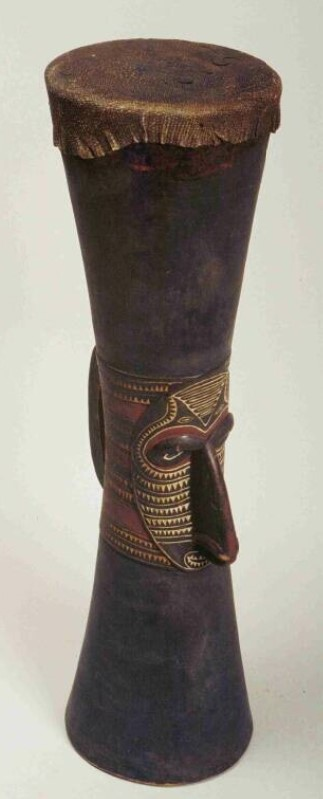
Tifa drum, Yabim people, Huon Peninsula, Papua New Guinea. Resembles the kundu drum.
