= Tifa totobuang =

Indonesian traditional musical instrument

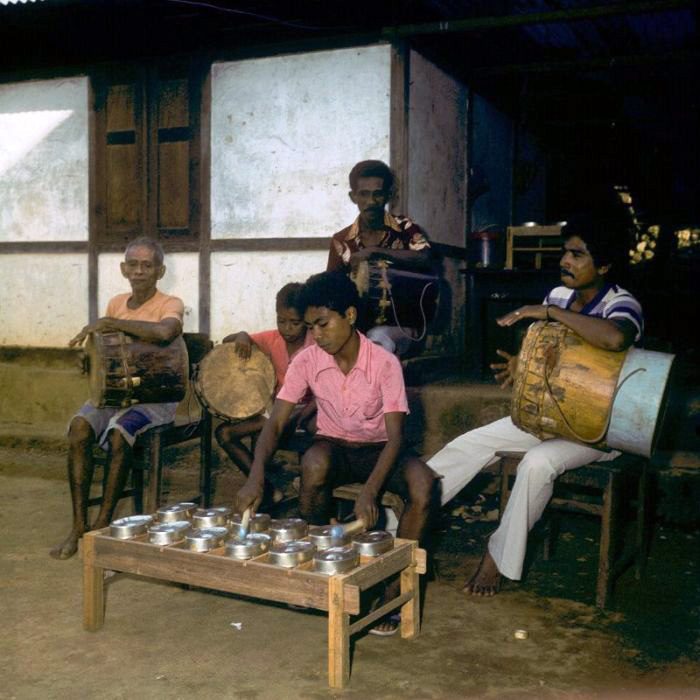
- A Tifa totobuang ensemble, a traditional musical instrument from the East Indonesia region
- Classification: Percussion instrument; Idiophone; Gong
- Developed: Indonesia (Maluku)

Playing range
- Pelog and Slendro scales

Related instruments
- bonang, kenong, canang, keromong, kromong, kethuk, trompong/terompong, rejong, khong wong yai/khong wong lek, khong toch/ khong thom, khong vong, krewaing/krewong

More articles or information
- Gamelan; Kulintang; Talempong

A tifa totobuang is a music ensemble from the Maluku Islands, related to the kulintang orchestra. It consists of a set of a double row of gong chimes known as the totobuang (similar to set of bonang gong chimes) and a set of tifa drums. It can also include a large gong.

The name comes from the instruments' collaboration. The ensemble can accompany the Maluku Island's Sawat Lenso dance.

The custom dates back at least to the late 17th or early 18th century. Gong-chime and drum ensembles, labeled tifa totobuang, were mentioned by François Valentijn, a Dutch army cleric who served in the Dutch army in Ambon, Maluku in two tours, 1686-1994 and 1703–1713. Valentijn talked about hearing "some Javanese lasses sing to the sound of a gong and a tifa (i.e. drum) and of a native zither...a large number of gongs and tifas."

== Instruments ==
=== Tifa ===
The tifa drums used for the tifa totobuang have been classed into five sizes. These include, from smallest to largest:

- tifa jekir
- tifa dasar (basic tifa)
- tifa potong
- tifa jekir potong
- tifa bas (bass tifa)

Each size of instrument has a different sound, and they are blended together in the orchestra. Different images and videos of the tifas being played show them drummed with empty hands, with sticks and with a combination of the two.

=== Totobuang ===
The totobuang is a set of gong chimes. Photos show the instrument in more than one configuration. One is laid out the same as the bonang, in two equal rows. Other images show a square pattern of 9 or 16 gong chimes.

Jaap Kunst, a musicologist who wrote about Javanese music, said that totobuang was probably another word for bonang which could be used for any instrument played with a hammer.

== Sawat dance ==
The tifa totobuang played music oriented toward Christians, up until 2000, when there were riots in Ambon. After that, the instrument began to play in cultural events with more "Islamic and Malay nuances." The Sawat dance is associated with traders, Arabs who traded in the "Al-Muluk peninsula". The Lenso is a dance from Christian areas, backed by tambourines, drums, or tifa totobuang. The two were deliberately combined into the modern Sawat by a group of women who wanted to dance together. The result is a modern product that combines two of the country's separate arts, one music and one dance.

== Gallery ==
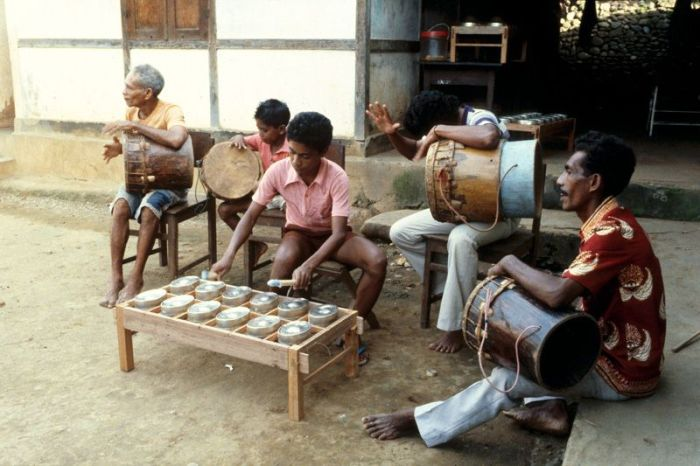
Musicians playing totobuang gong chimes and tifa drums at Amahusu.

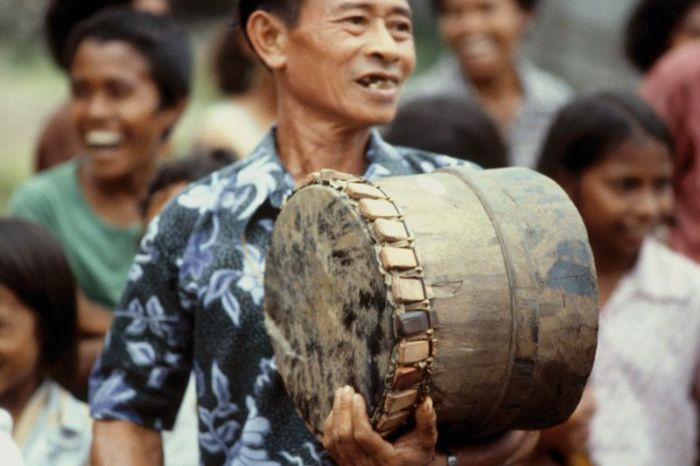
Musician playing tifa drum during tug-of-war matches at Ullath.

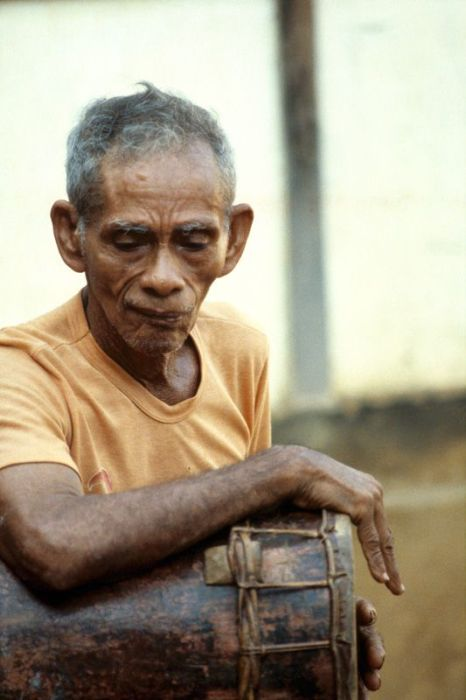
Musician's playing tifa drum at Amahusu.

== See also ==
- Gamelan
- Kulintang
- Talempong
- Kolintang
- Music of Indonesia
- Tari Saureka Reka, Indonesian Wikipedia article about the Sawat dance.
