= Sing-sing (New Guinea) =

Gathering of a few tribes or villages in Papua New Guinea

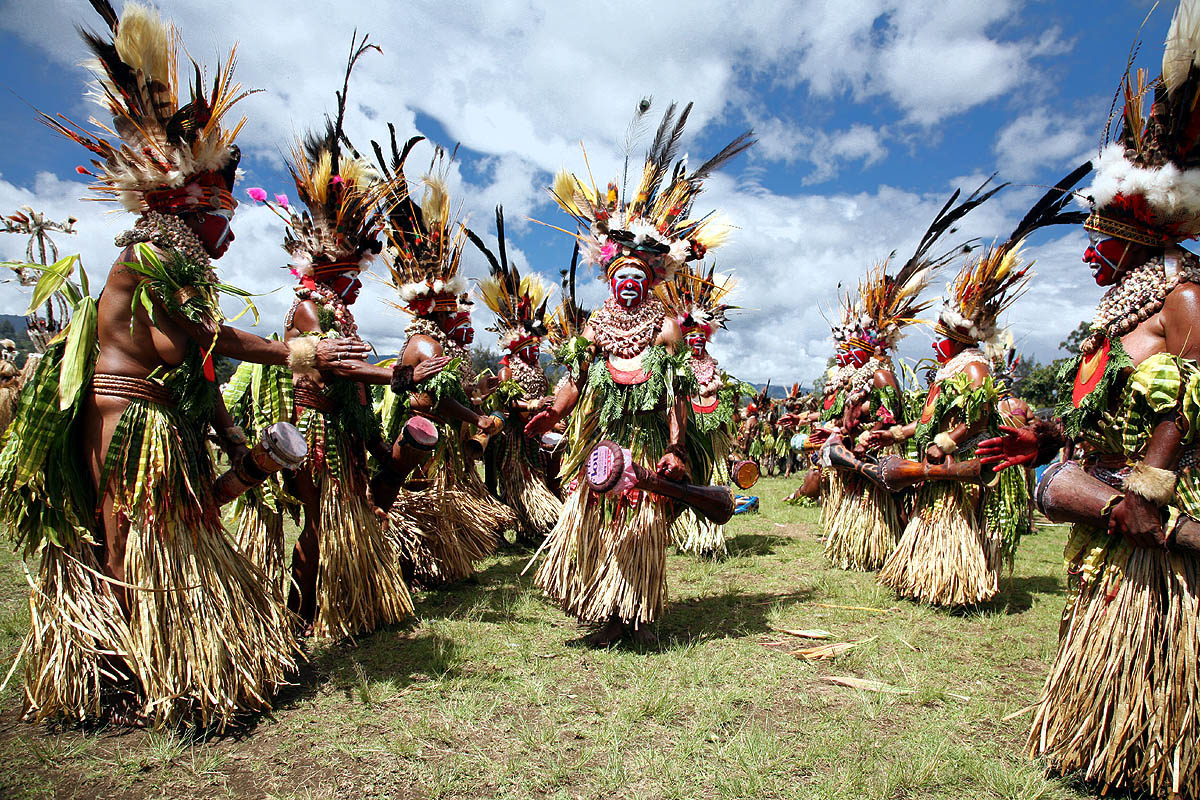
A sing-sing scene in Wabag, Enga Province, Papua New Guinea

Sing-sing is an annual gathering of tribes or villages in Papua New Guinea. People show their distinct culture, dance and music and share traditions. Villagers paint and decorate themselves for sing-sings.

== See also ==
- Goroka Show, famous annual tribal gathering
- Mount Hagen
- List of folk festivals
- Pow wow
