= Louis Hoppe =

American painter

- Known for: Watercolor painting

Louis Hoppe was a folk artist who worked in Texas during the American Civil War years. Details of his life are nearly nonexistent; he is known by his works, four watercolor paintings, three of which are scenes in Colorado County, Texas. Among the few things known about Hoppe's background are that he was of German descent and that he worked as a laborer at one of the farms depicted in his paintings. All of his known works are held by the San Antonio Museum of Art.
