= San Antonio Museum of Art =

Art museum in San Antonio, Texas

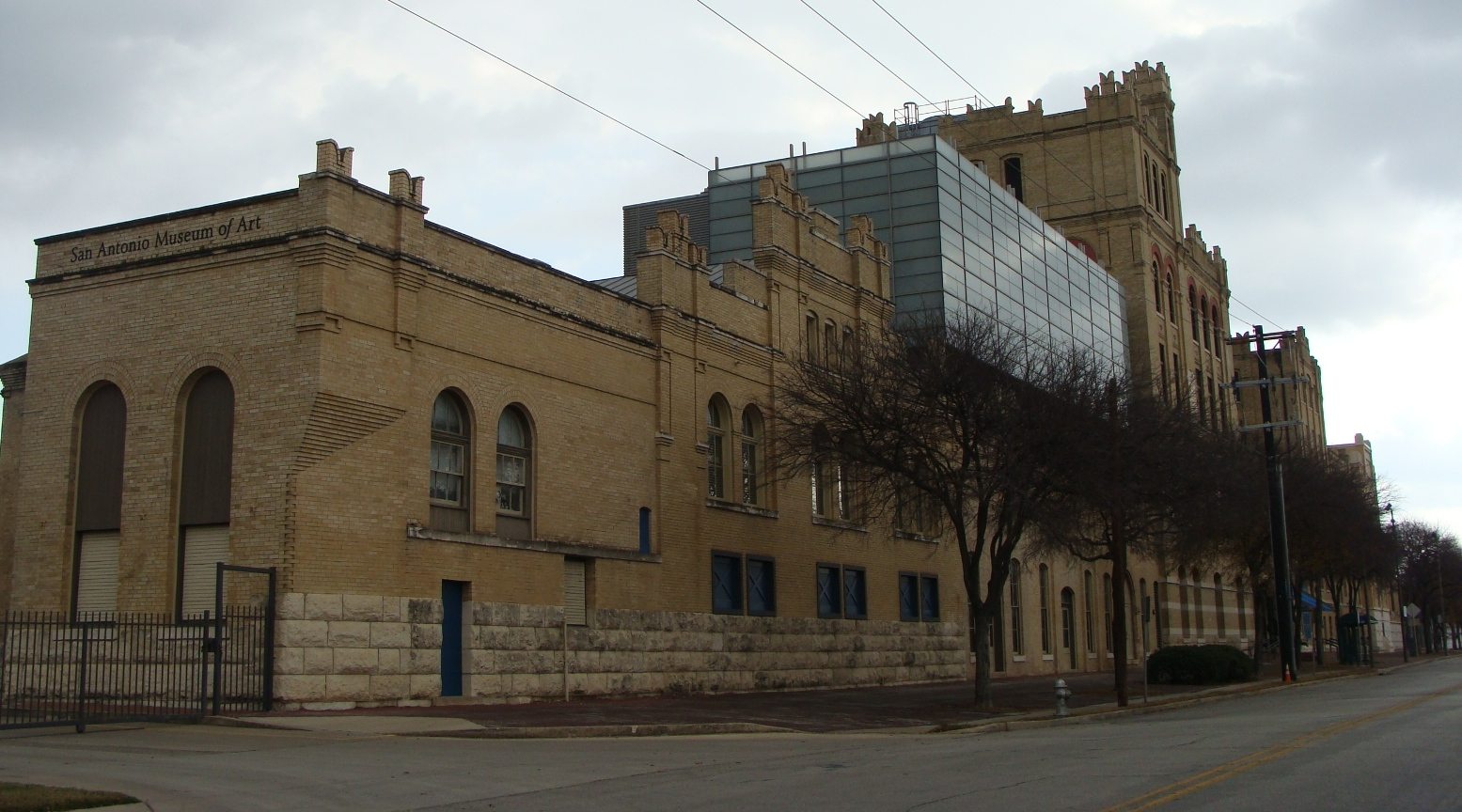
- The San Antonio Museum of Art

- Location of SAMA in Texas
- Established: 1981
- Location: 200 West Jones Avenue; San Antonio, Texas; United States
- Coordinates: 29.437568°N 98.482089°W
- Director: Emily Neff
- Website: www.samuseum.org

The San Antonio Museum of Art (SAMA) is an art museum in Downtown San Antonio, Texas, USA. The museum spans 5,000 years of global culture. The museum is housed in the historic former Lone Star Brewery (1886) on the Museum Reach of the San Antonio River Walk. Following a $7.2 million renovation, it opened to the public in March 1981.

== History ==
In 1926, the San Antonio Museum Association founded the Witte Memorial Museum with the intentions of collecting various works of art and natural history objects. By the 1970s, the Witte Memorial Museum acquired notable works of art by artists such as Frank Stella, Wayne Thiebaud, and Philip Guston. Due to the growing pace of art acquisitions, Jack McGregor (former director of the San Antonio Museum Association) recommended the board purchase the former Lone Star Brewery complex and split away from the Witte Memorial Museum. SAMA officially opened its doors to the public on March 1, 1981.

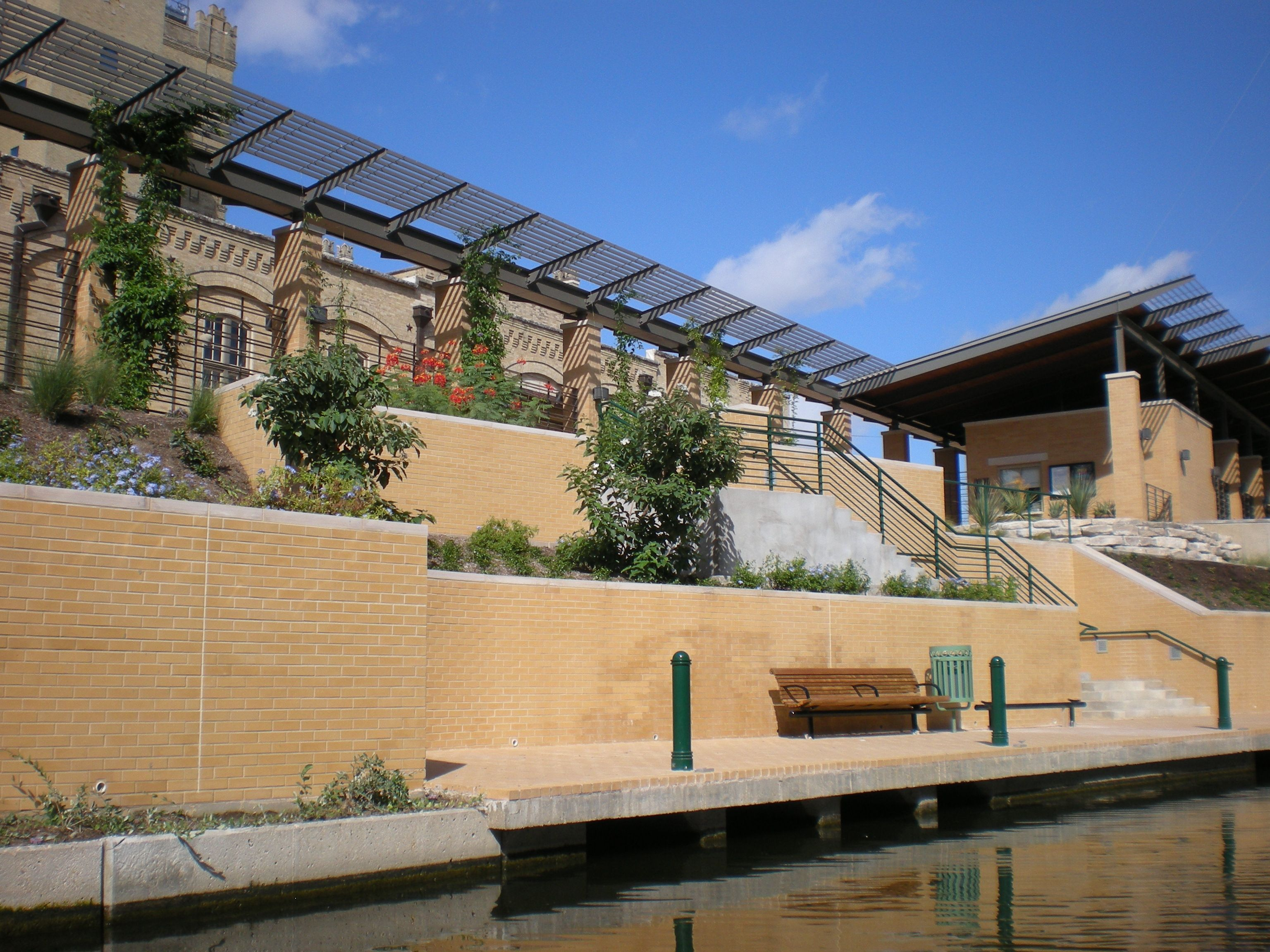
Landing for the San Antonio Museum of Art on the San Antonio River Walk "Museum Reach" extension

In 1985, it received collections of Latin American Folk Art formed by former vice president Nelson A. Rockefeller and Robert K. Winn.

The museum is situated on the northern section of the Riverwalk. With the opening of the Gloria Galt River Landing in 2009, it now anchors the "Museum Reach" expansion of the celebrated Riverwalk.

With the additions of the 7,000 ft^{2} Cowden Gallery in 1991, the 30,000 ft^{2} Rockefeller Center for Latin American Art in 1998 and the 15,000 ft^{2} Brown Asian Art Wing in 2005, the gallery space totals 87,500 ft^{2}.

== Collections ==
The museum's collection of more than 30,000 objects representing 5,000 years of history and culture from every region of the world includes important works from Egyptian, Greek and Roman antiquities, Asian art, Latin American art, and Contemporary art.

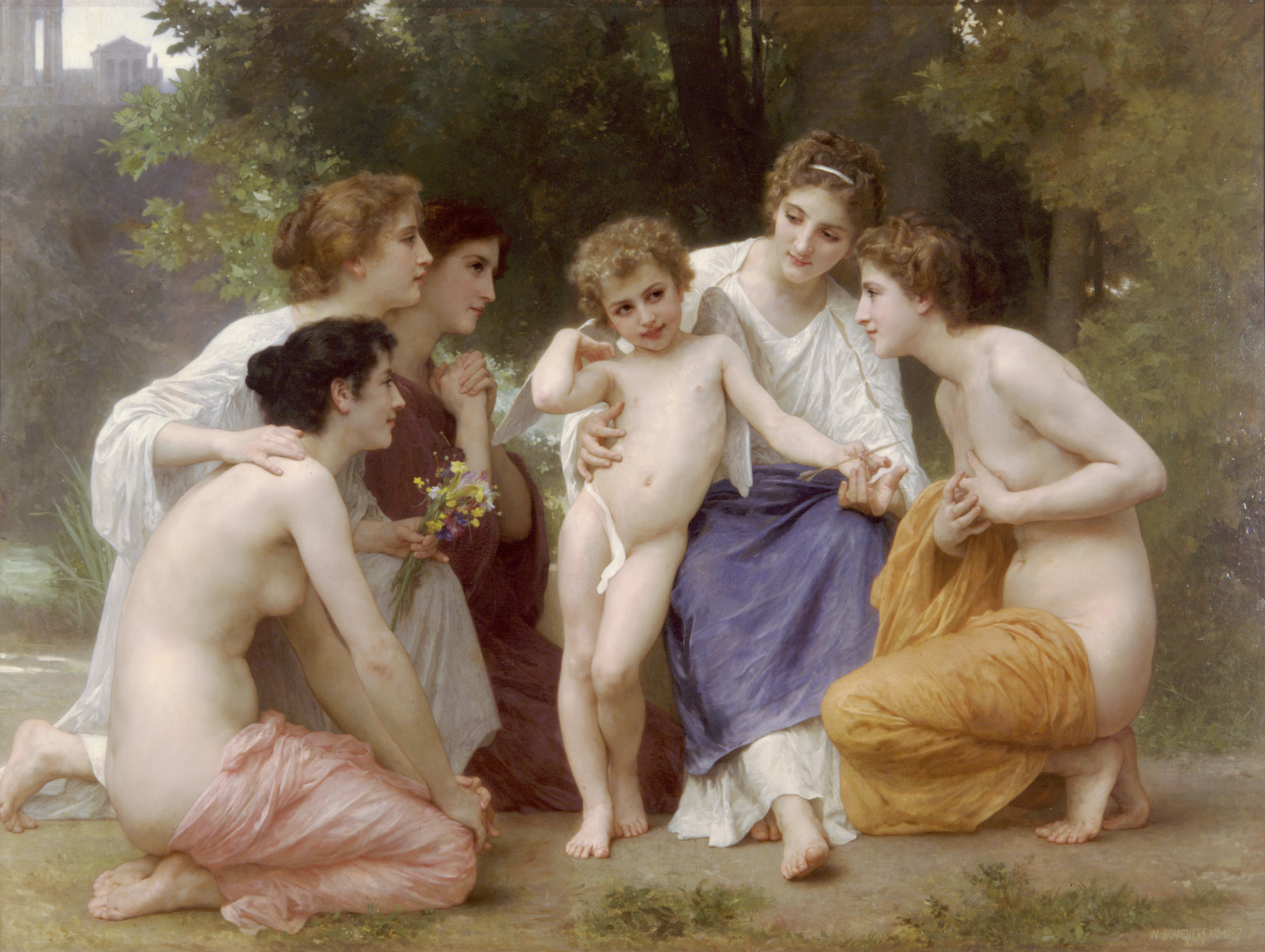
A William-Adolphe Bouguereau (1825–1905) painting on display entitled Admiration (1897).

=== Art of the Ancient Mediterranean World ===
The museum houses one of the largest and most comprehensive collections of ancient Egyptian, Near Eastern, Greek and Roman art in the southern United States. The Egyptian collection hold objects from the Pre-dynastic through the late Roman and Byzantine periods. It also houses an important and rare collection of Greek and Roman sculpture that encompasses portraits, funerary sculpture, and mythological subjects.

=== Asian Art ===
The Asian art collection is housed in the Lenora and Walter F. Brown Asian Art Wing, a 15,000 square foot suite of galleries that opened in 2005. Over the past 70 years, the museum's Asian art collections have grown to become one of the most impressive in the United States, including more than 1,500 works from China, India, Japan, Korea, Laos, Mongolia, Myanmar, Nepal, Pakistan, Sri Lanka, Thailand, Tibet, and Vietnam.

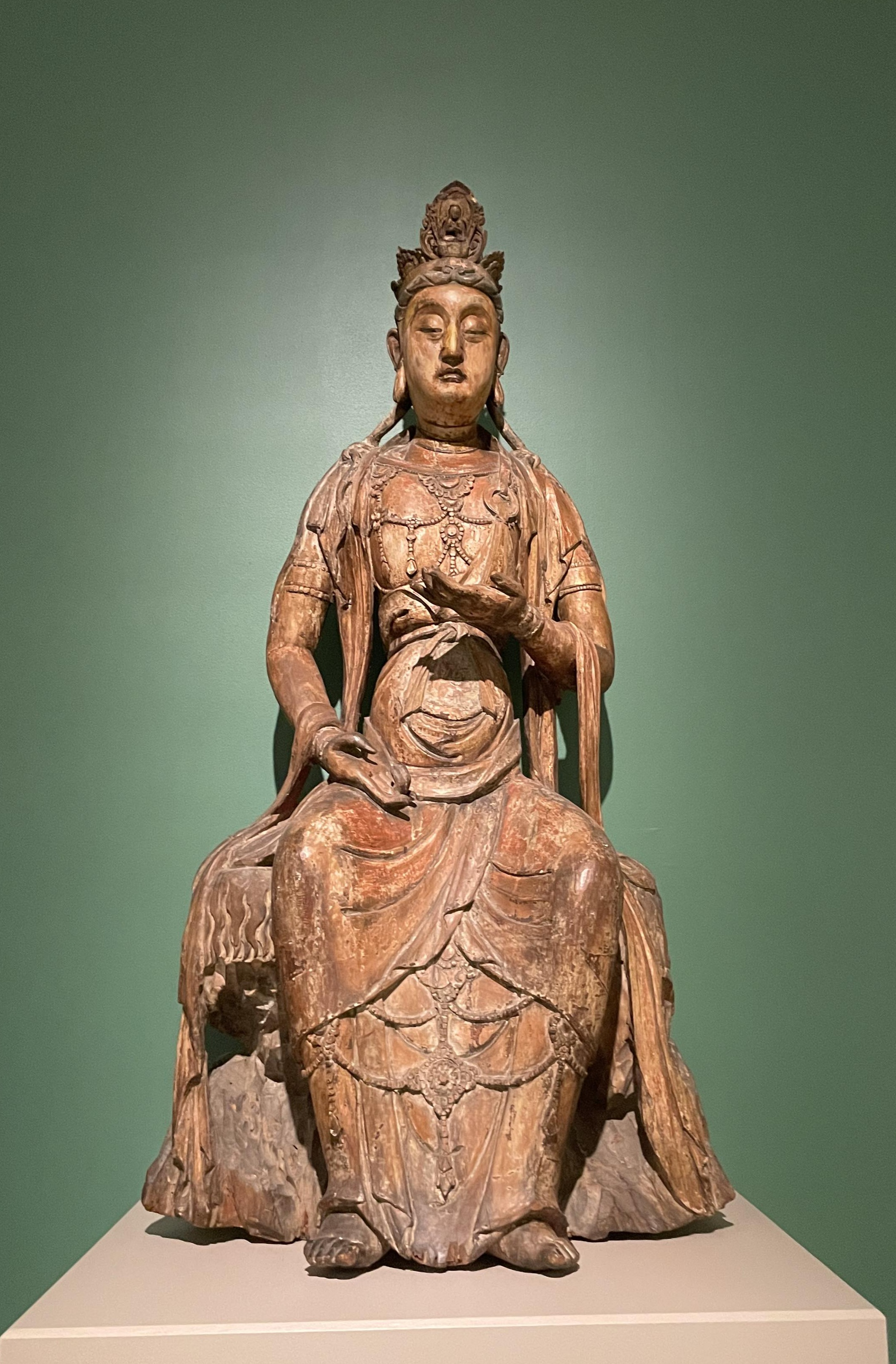
A 13th century Chinese wood sculpture of the Bodhisattva Guanyin.

=== Latin American ===
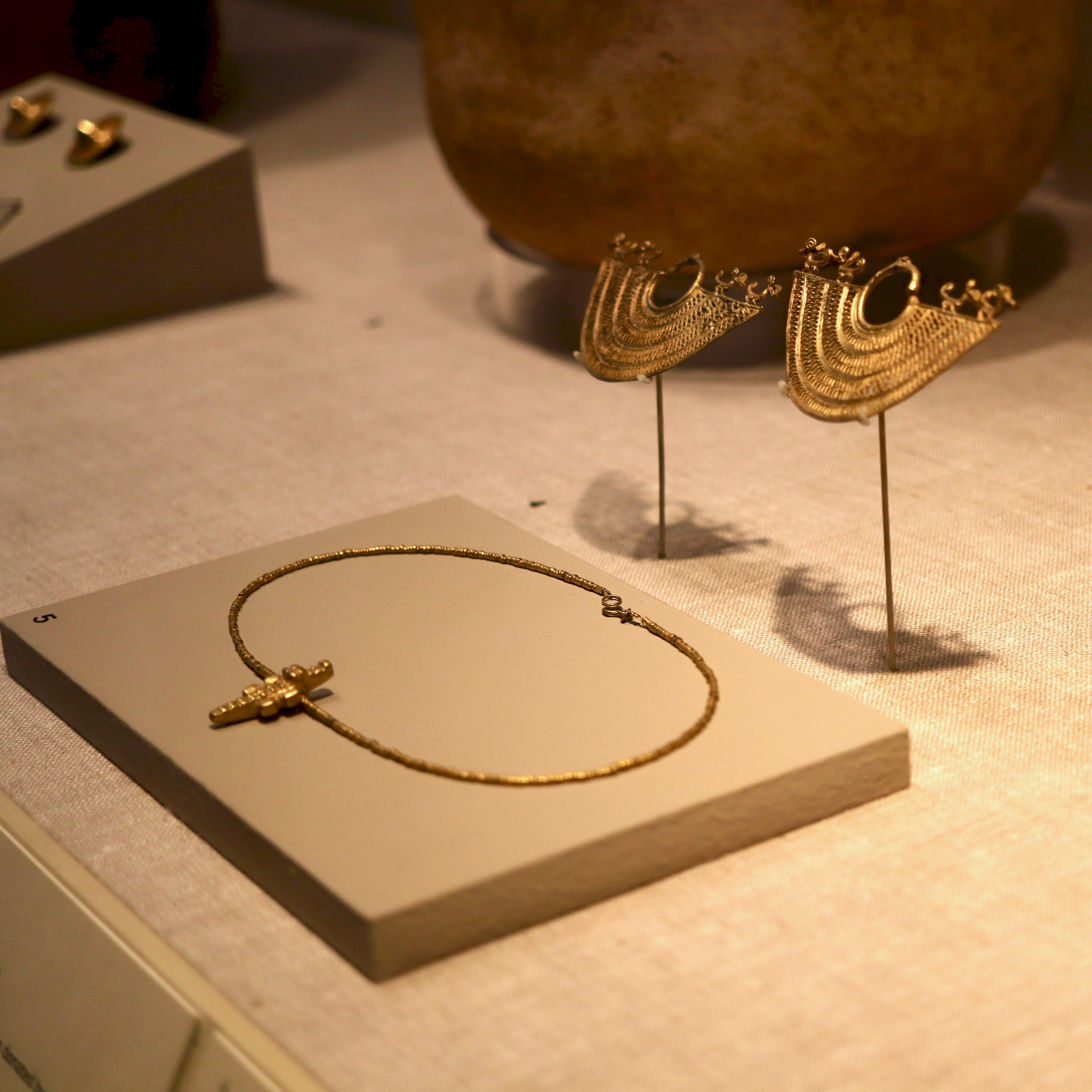
A Calima culture necklace from 200 AD and Zenú earrings from 800 AD. On display in Latin American Art

The museum has one of the most comprehensive collections of Latin American art in the United States. The collection is housed in the Nelson A. Rockefeller Center for Latin American Art, which opened to the public in 1998. The center offers an overview of artwork from Mexico, Central and South America, and many counties of the Caribbean, and one of the world's most important repositories of Latin American folk art with a collection numbering over 7,000 objects.

=== Contemporary ===
A significant portion of the museum's Contemporary collection is devoted to post-World War II American painting and sculpture, including an emphasis on modernist abstraction. In addition, it has always been committed to the collection of Contemporary Texas Art, and it features paintings and sculpture produced by Texas artists form the last 1960s to present day. The collection includes two sculptures by San Antonio-born Bonnie MacLeary.

=== Oceanic ===
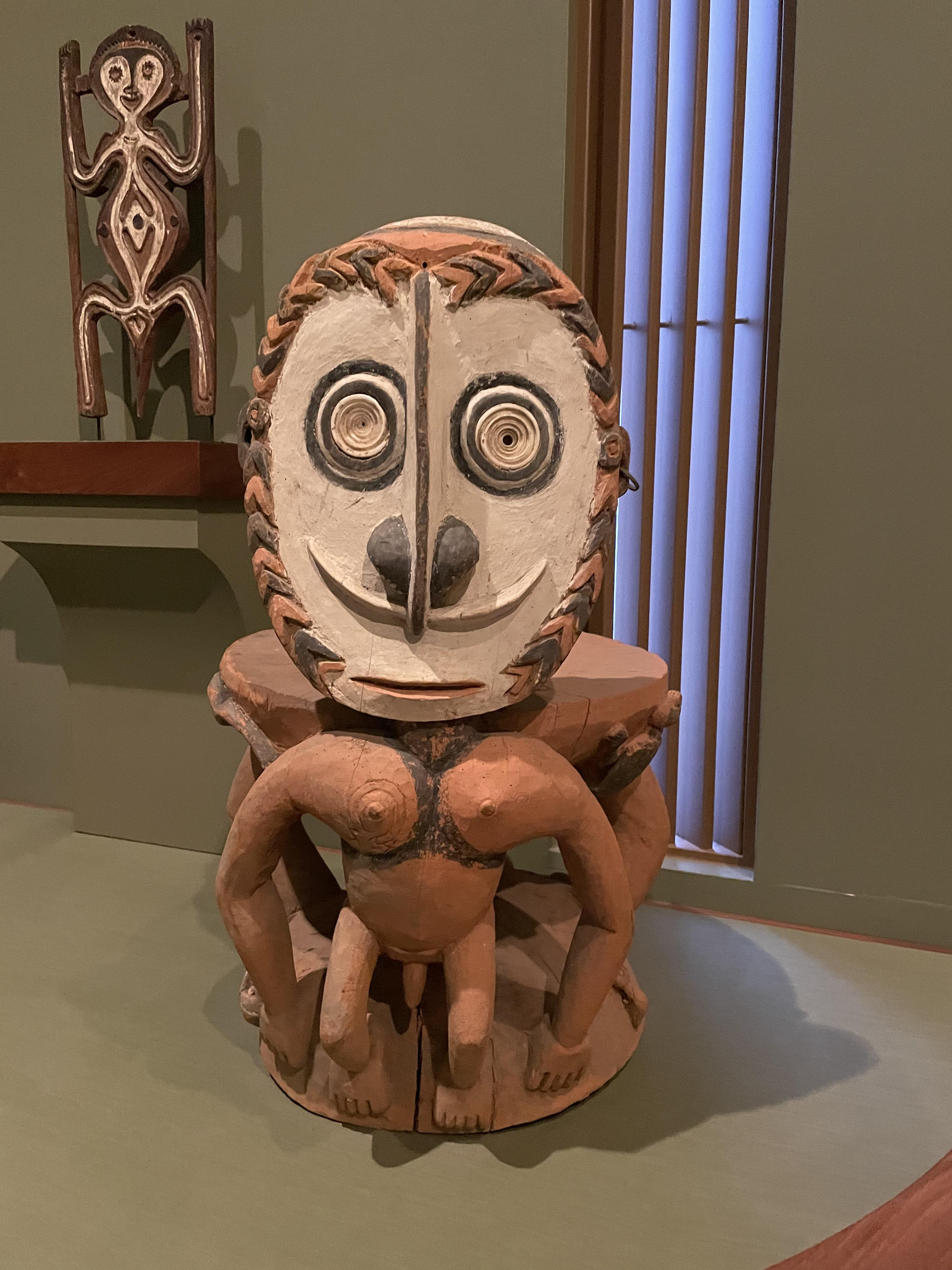
A wooden pulpit from the Iatmul people of Papua New Guinea

The museum also contains a collection devoted to Oceanic art, found on the fourth floor of the Nancy Brown Negley West Tower. Works from Papua New Guinea and French Polynesia comprise a large part of the collection. Maori, Hawaiian, and Aboriginal Australian art can also be found in the collection.

== Former streetcar service ==
From 1982 through 1985, the museum also operated a heritage streetcar service, using an original San Antonio streetcar built in 1913 and nicknamed "Old 300". The all-yellow car operated on a short section of Texas Transportation Company (TXTC) tracks behind it. TXTC was an electric railroad, operating trains powered from overhead trolley wires, and its tracks still reached the former Lone Star Brewery complex, in which it was installed in 1981. Streetcar service in San Antonio ended in 1933, but car 300 was preserved at that time by the San Antonio Museums Association. In 1981, volunteers restored car 300 to operating condition as a historical attraction.

Public operation began in October 1982. The car ran twice a day Tuesday through Friday and six times a day on weekends, but budget cuts led to the service's being discontinued at the end of 1985. The 1913 streetcar was placed in storage, being operated (without passengers) a few times a year to keep it in running condition, until 1990, when it was leased to a company in Portland, Oregon, for use on the Willamette Shore Trolley line there.

The museum continued to be car 300's owner, leasing it to entities in Oregon, but in 2005 it sold the car to the Astoria Riverfront Trolley Association, who had been operating it on a popular heritage streetcar line in Astoria, Oregon, since 1999.
