= Papua New Guinean art =

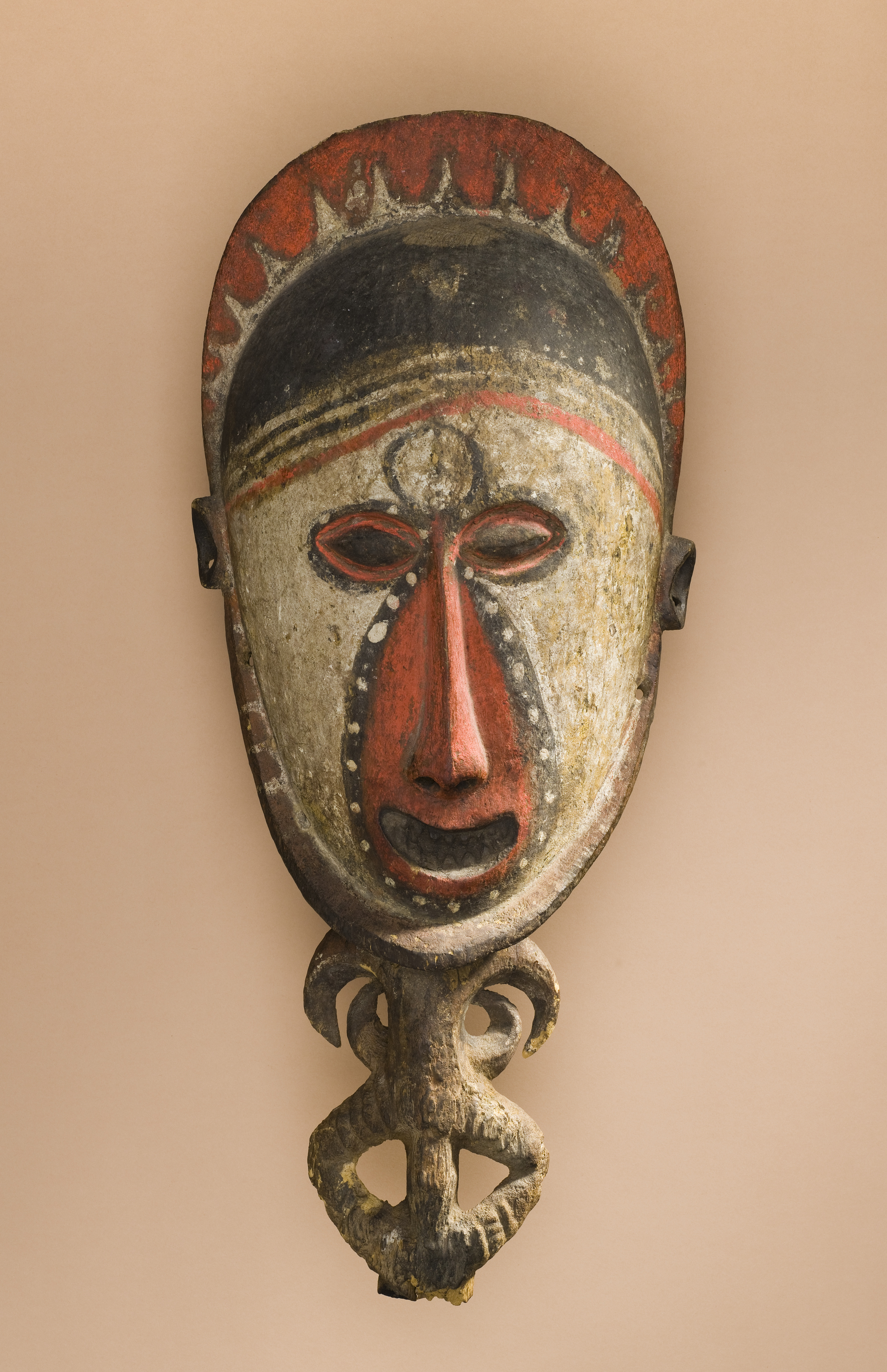
20th–century figurine from East Sepik Province

Papua New Guinean art refers to visual art created in Papua New Guinea or by Papua New Guinean artists. Papua New Guinea has been inhabited by humans for roughly 50,000 years; throughout that period, the hundreds of distinct ethnic groups of the island developed unique artistics traditions and styles. Statues and figurines, ritual masks, carvings, and weavings, all generally with spiritual and religious significance, comprise a majority of the art created historically in Papua New Guinea. In the late 20th century, a contemporary art movement emerged roughly the same time as the country gained its independence in the 1970s. This movement reflected both the nation's tribal traditions and customs as well as its progression towards modernization.

== History ==
=== Before European contact ===
Humans are believed to have first inhabited the highlands of the island of New Guinea, which would later become part of the country of Papua New Guinea, around 50,000 years ago. Many of the villages that eventually developed on the island had little contact with one another due to impassable terrain, causing them to diverge culturally, as evidenced by the ethnic and linguistic diversity present throughout Papua New Guinea. Alongside this cultural divergence, distinct and unique artistic styles and traditions emerged among the different groups.

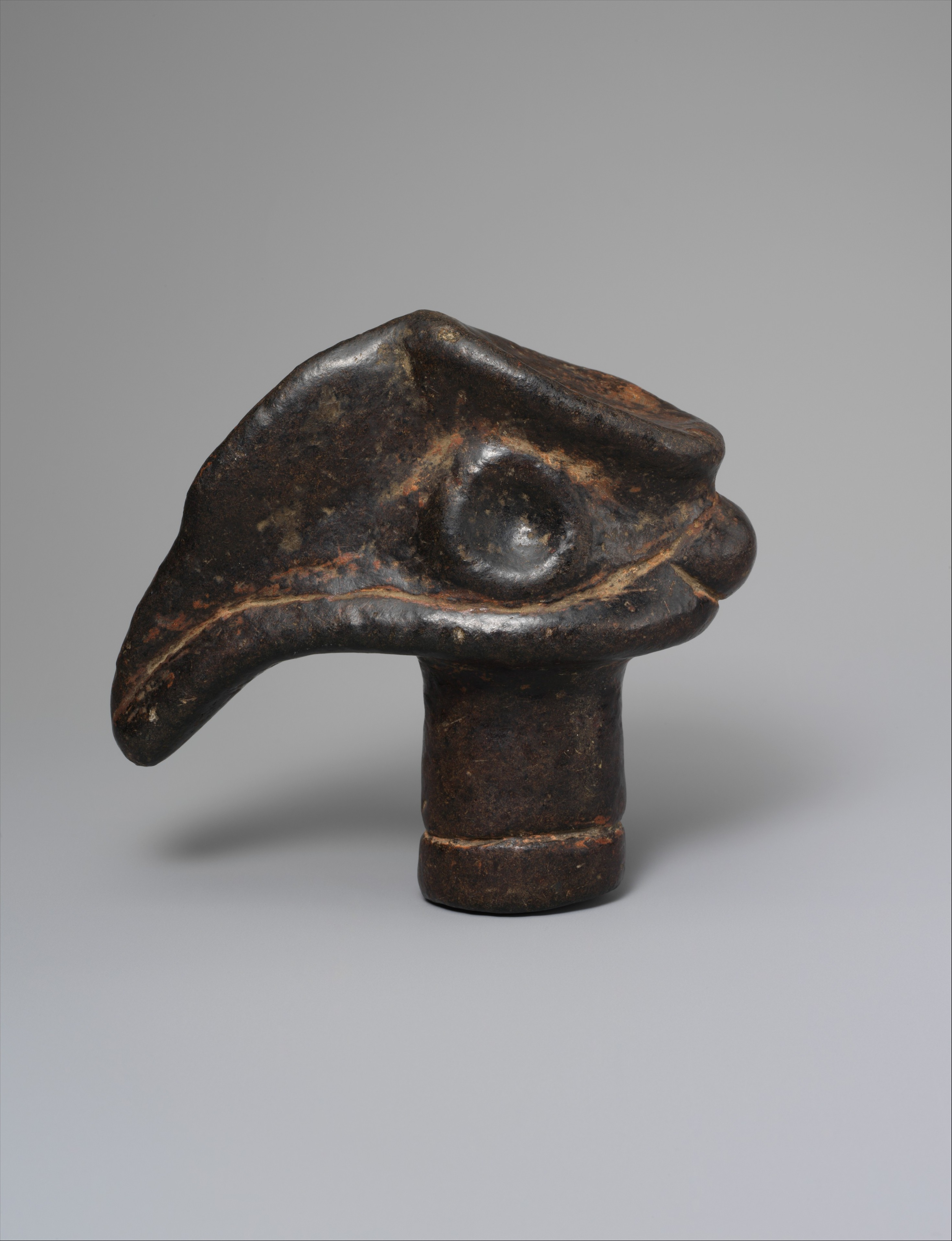
Early Morobe Province stone bird figure

Much of the art created during this early period had a religious or spiritual significance, and were likely used in tribal rituals; humans and animals such as birds and echidnas were often subjects. For example, in New Ireland, complex sculptures depicting humans, fish, and birds in a totemic arrangement were, and continue to be, fabricated for malagan ceremonies, which are an intricate series of rituals commemorating death, among other symbolic ideas. Additionally, uli figures are wooden statues carved and painted to resemble deceased ancestors in mortuary ceremonies.

The people of Papua New Guinea utilized many different mediums for their art, including stone, wood, fibers, pigments, and seashells. Their creations often took the form of masks, statues, figurines, carvings and weavings. Some peoples even created ceremonial houses, shields, instruments, and overmodelled skulls.

=== European contact and colonization ===
European sailors first made contact with the peoples of Papua New Guinea, as well as many other islands in Oceania, as early as the 16th century. New Guinea was colonized and divided between the German Empire and the Great Britain by 1884; Australia would later take control of the nation of Papua New Guinea in 1921 following World War I. During the Papua New Guinea's period of colonization in the 19th and 20th centuries, European collectors frequently exported art pieces from the colony abroad to England and Australia. This practice was so commonplace that it led to common artistic objects virtually vanishing from local villages. The Papua New Guinea National Museum and Art Gallery was later opened in 1977 to combat this phenomenon. Despite the removal of many artifacts, the actual indigenous methods of art themselves survived and continued to be practiced by natives, somewhat unaffected by the European colonization of the islands.

=== Independence and contemporary movement ===
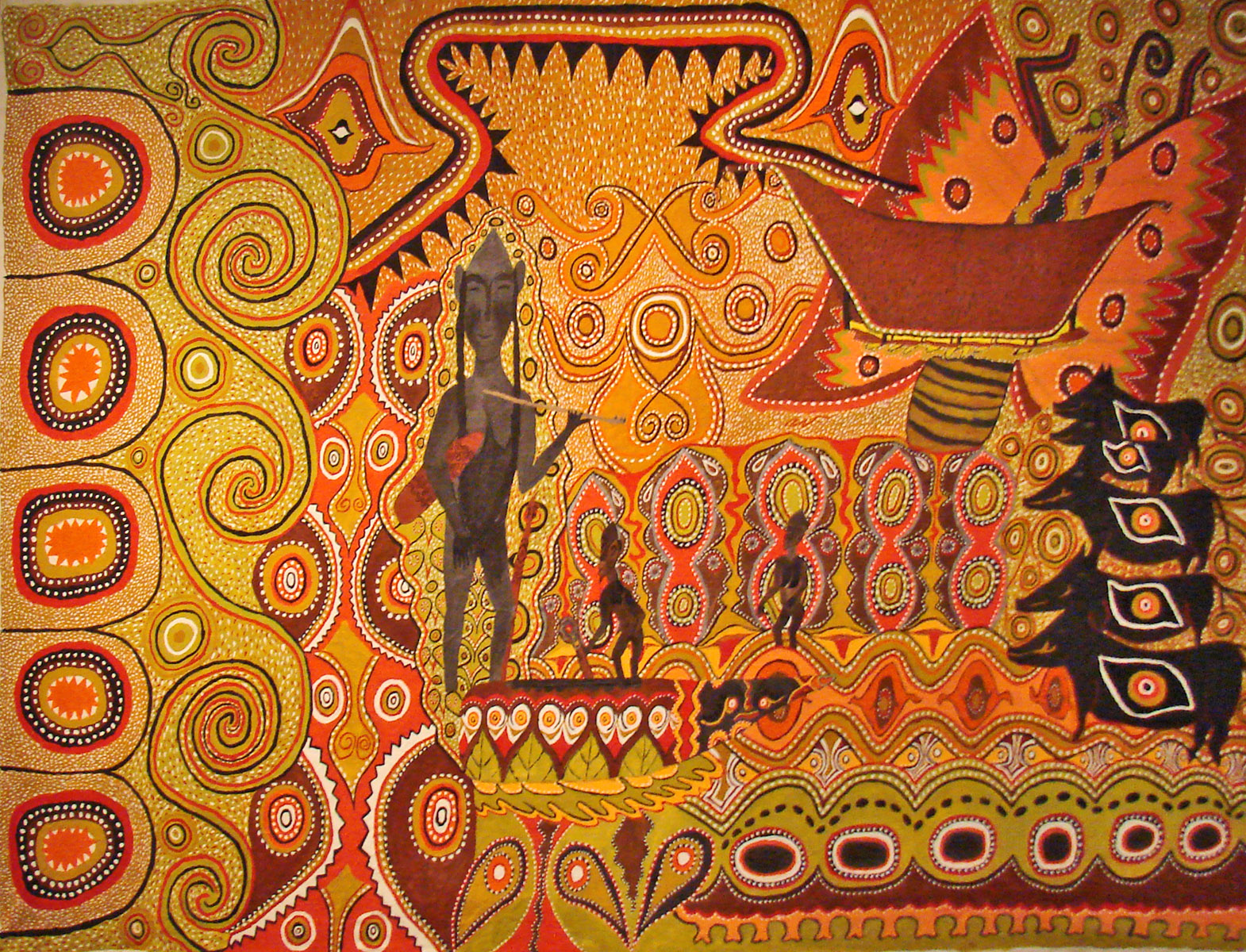
Contemporary painting by Robin Chiphowka Kowspi

Papua New Guinea gained its independence from Australia on 16 September 1975. Alongside its newly gained status as an independent nation, a contemporary art movement developed simultaneously in reaction to the drastic changes occurring in the country at the time. Early figures of this movement such as Matthias Kauage and Timothy Akis were major influences in the movement when it began in the 1960s and 1970s. These early members of the movement were themselves influenced by Western artists who had come to reside and teach in Papua New Guinea. Other noteworthy artists of this period included Joe Nalo, Larry Santana, and Jakupa Ako. These artists' work became so important to the fledgling nation's rapidly modernizing culture that they became nearly ubiquitous, even appearing on stamps and the exterior of National Parliament House in Port Moresby.

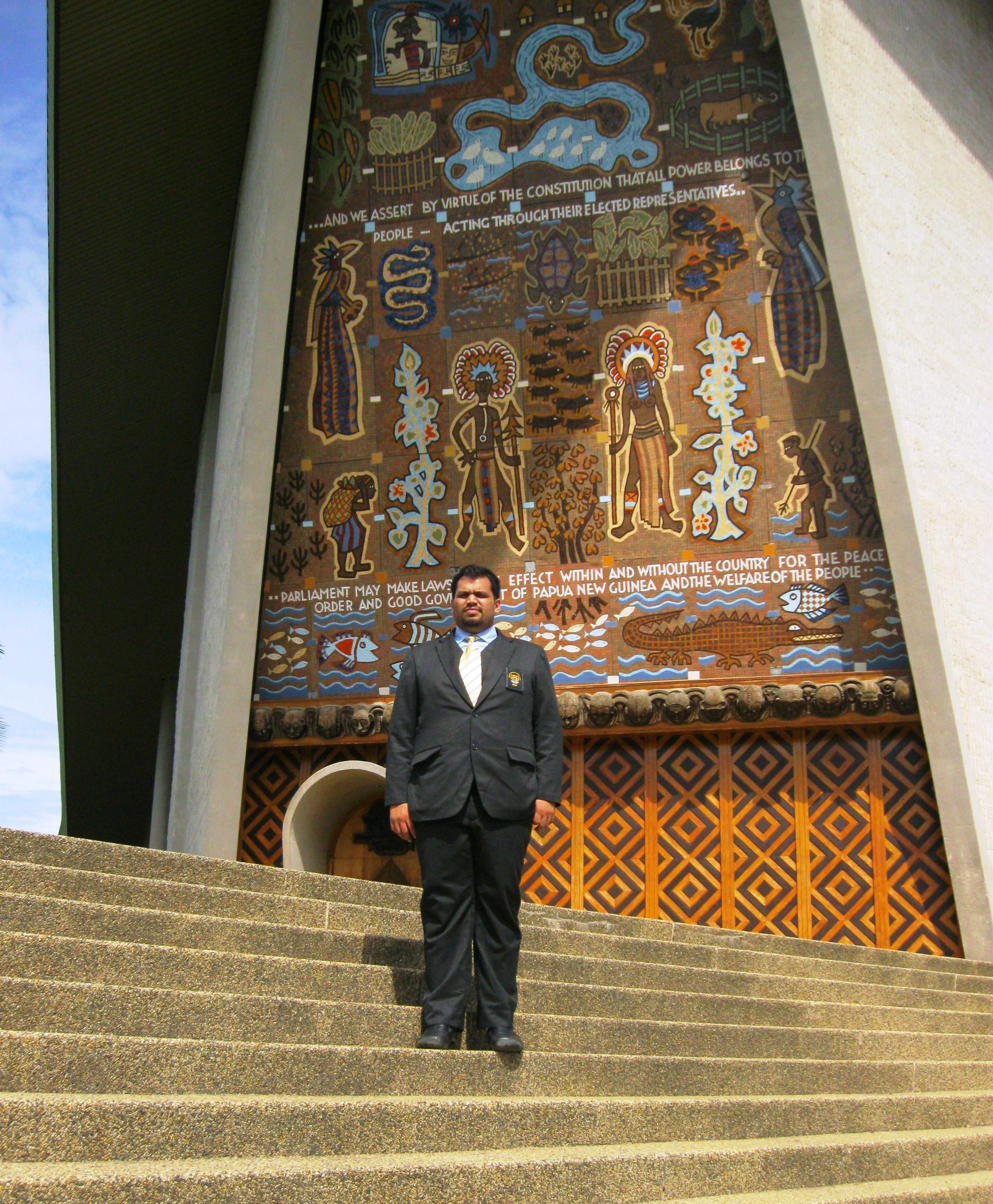
Wall painting on the National Parliament House

A major theme of the movement is the combination of artists' indigenous cultures with a Papua New Guinea's recently-attained statehood, modernization, and worldwide technological advance. This era was of great importance to the country, and the dramatic changes occurring in the country at the time socially and politically were commonly reflected in the works of artists of the time. Other themes, such as the AIDS pandemic, which reached Papua New Guinea in the late 1980s, were also portrayed by these artists. Paintings, generally featuring indigenous motifs combined with bright, bold colors and lines, became a major medium of art during this period. However, other traditional methods, such as statues, weavings, decorative shields, and pottery continued to be produced.

In addition to the contemporary movement, there has also been an effort to repatriate historical pieces that were taken abroad during the country's colonial period. A large amount of artwork created in Papua New Guinea still remains in museums in the United States, France, and Germany, among other countries. The first Prime Minister of Papua New Guinea, Michael Somare, once requested the return of cultural artifacts to the country, referring to them as "living spirits with fixed abodes," expressing their spiritual significance to Papua New Guineans. In 2020, the National Gallery of Australia transferred 225 artifacts, including masks and sculptures, to the Papua New Guinea National Museum and Art Gallery.

== Gallery ==
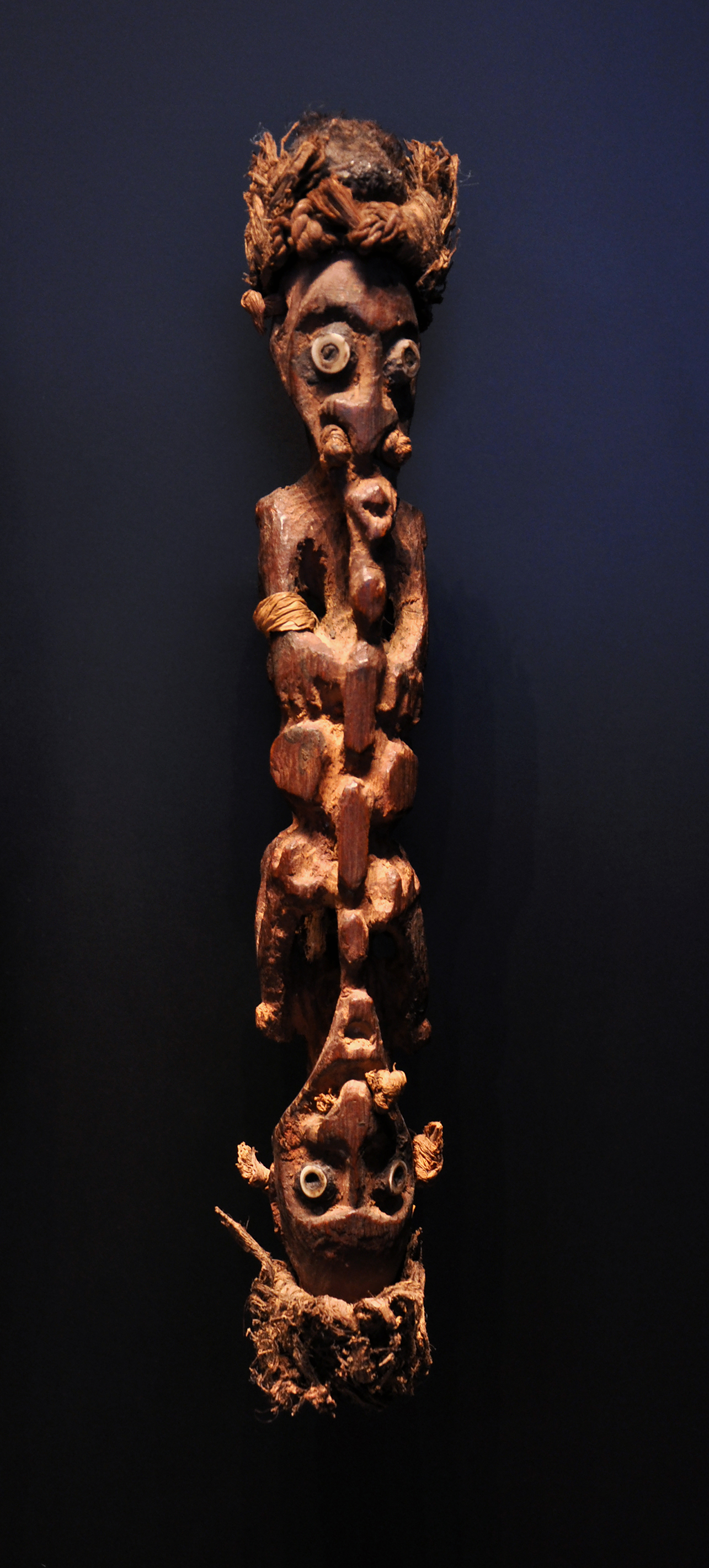
Statuette

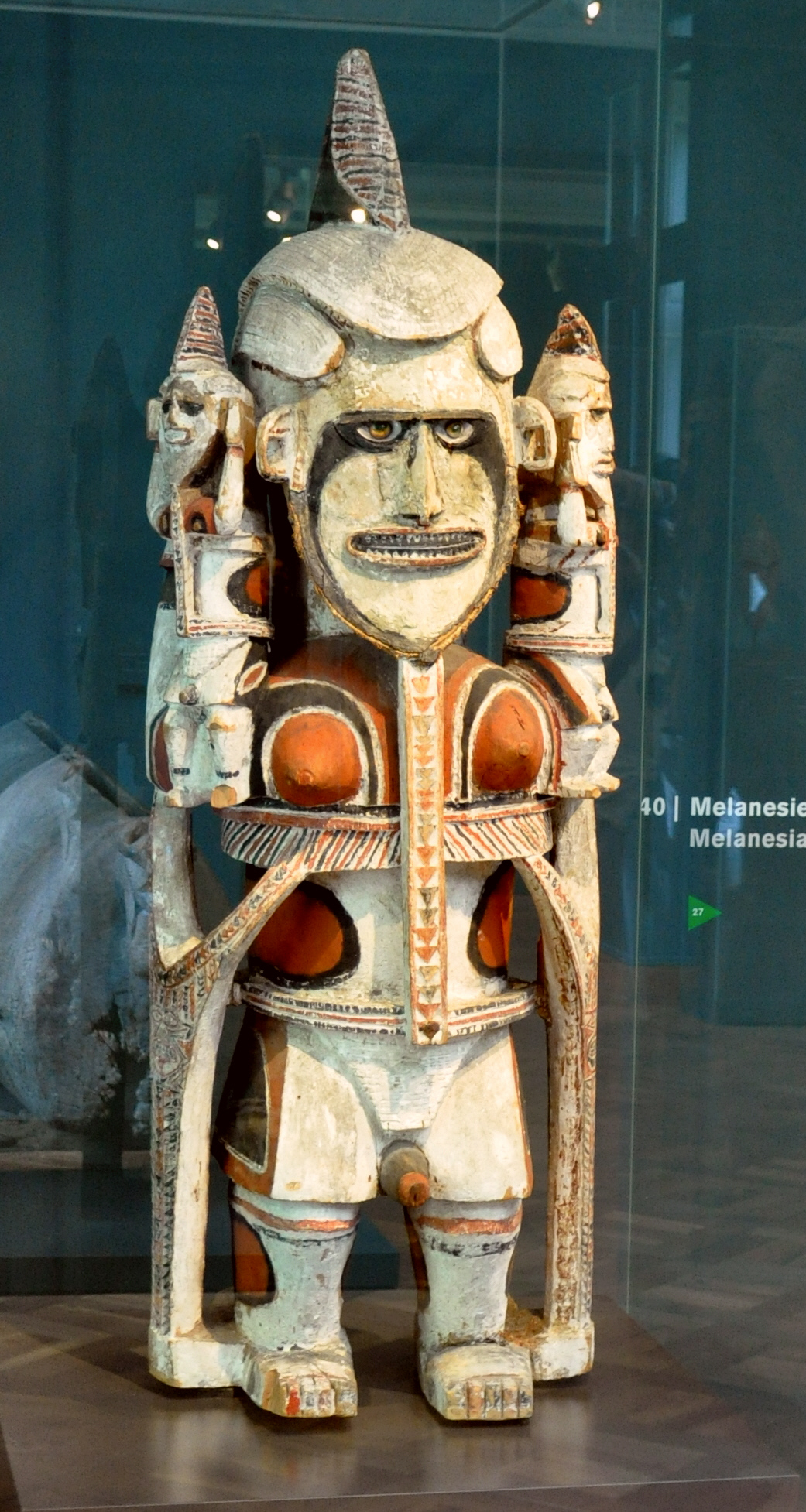
Uli figure

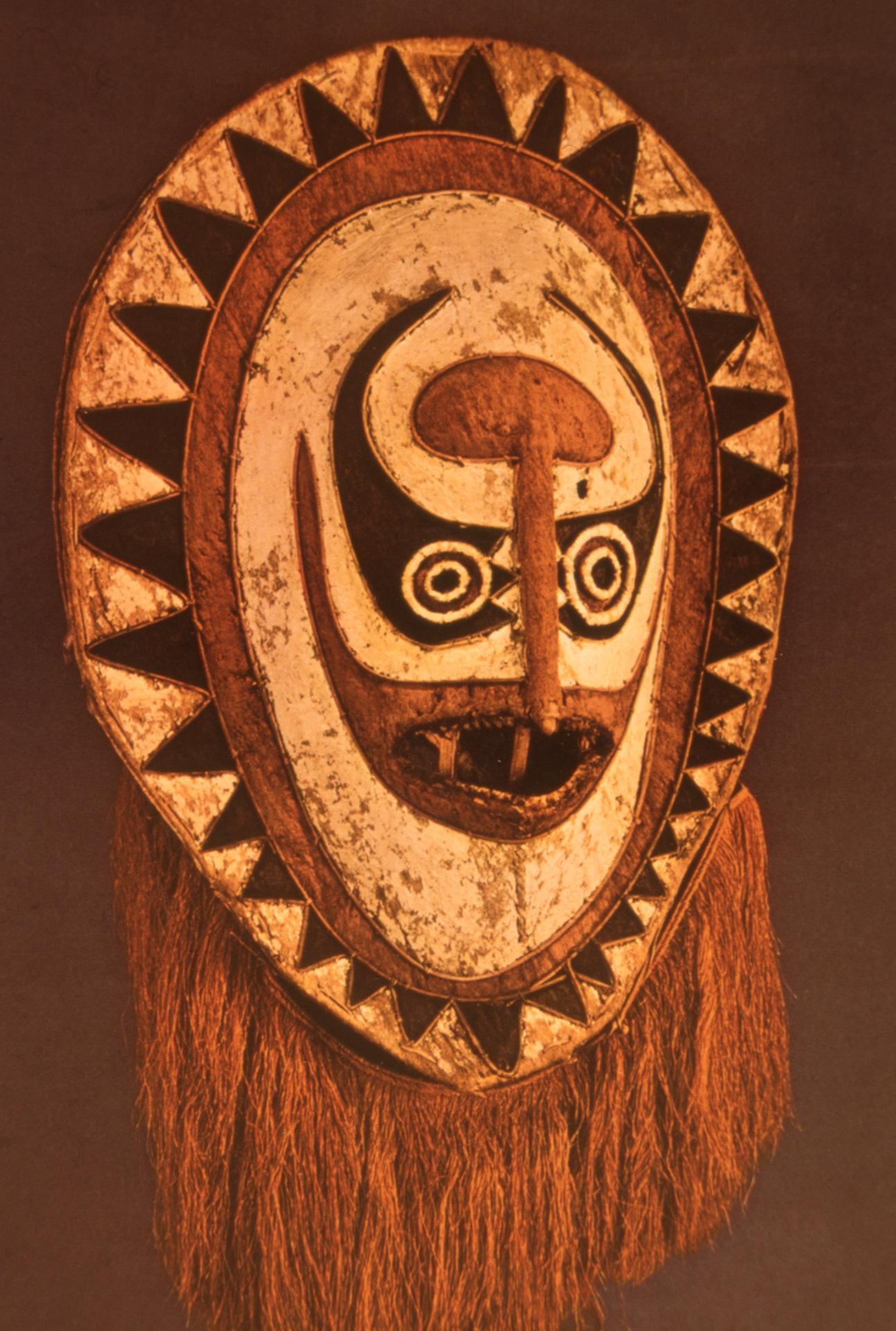
Mask

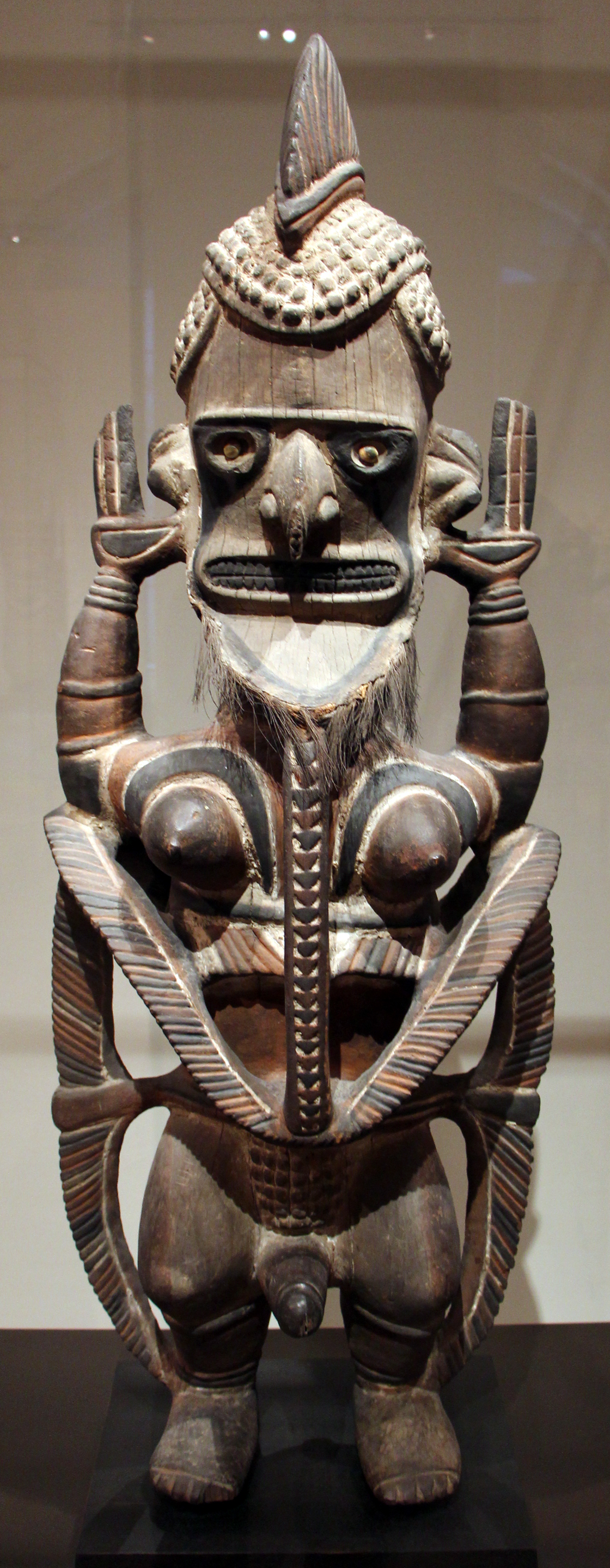
18th–19th century Uli figure

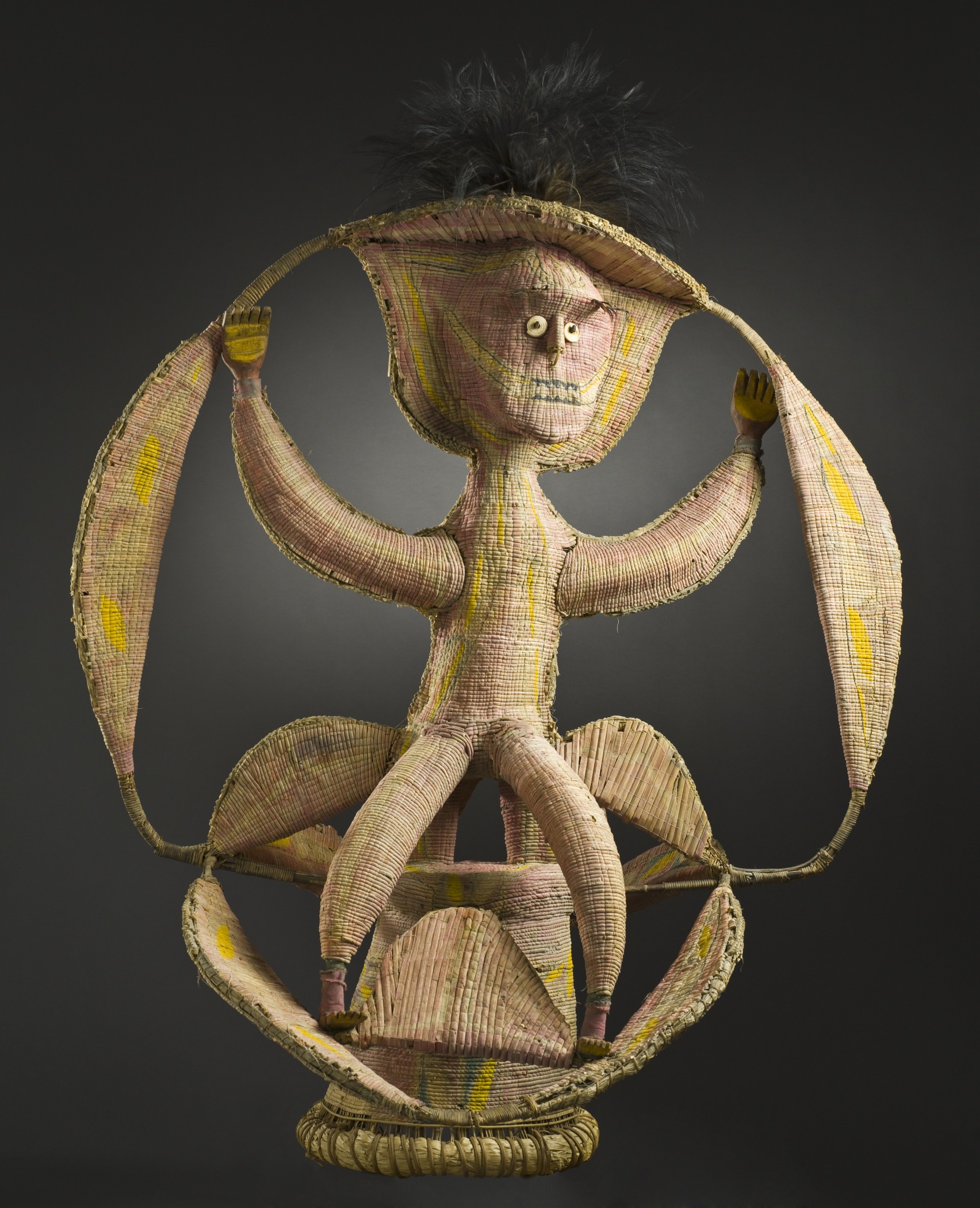
1880 Sulka dance headdress

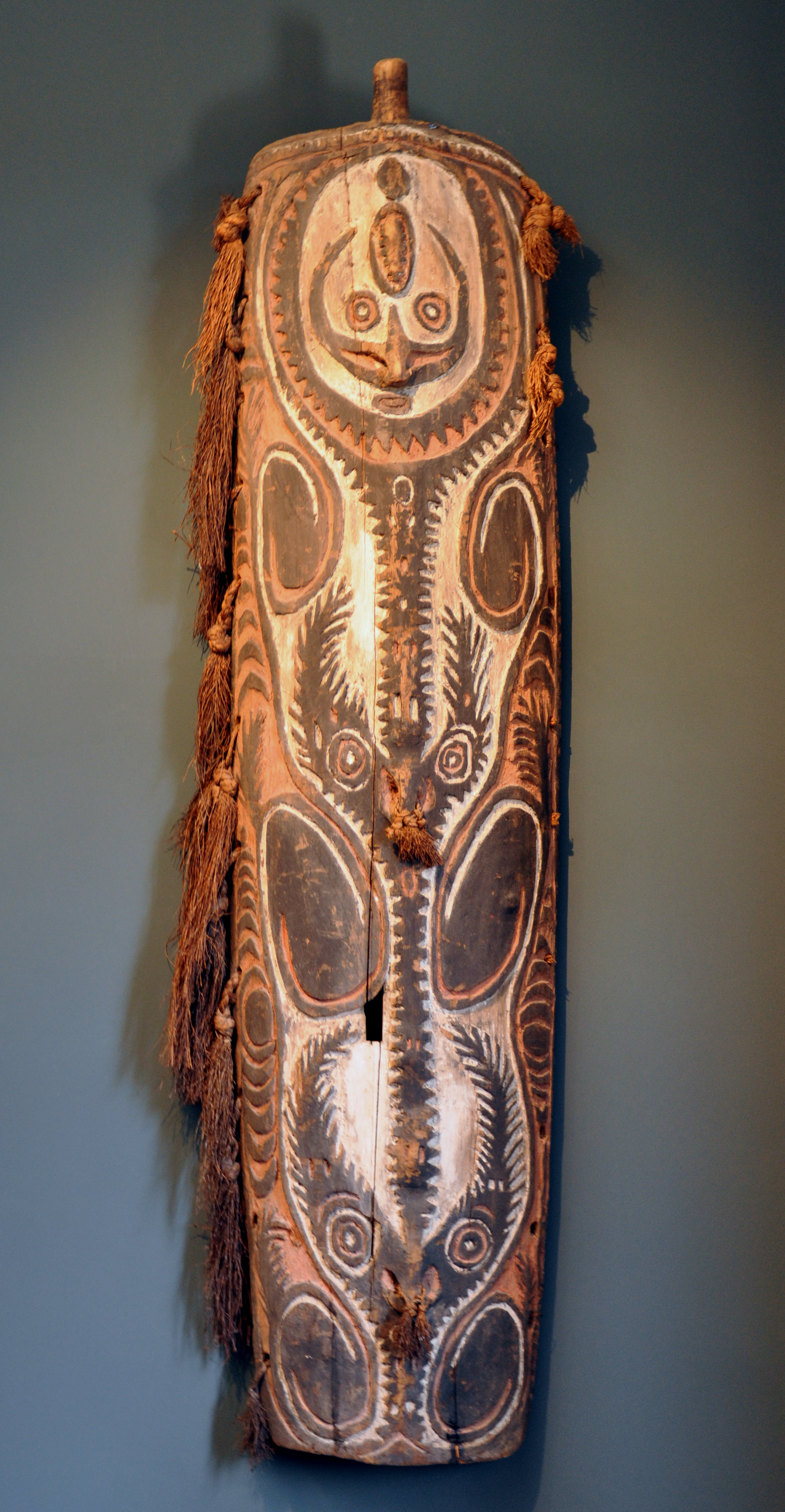
Sepik shield, 19th–20th century

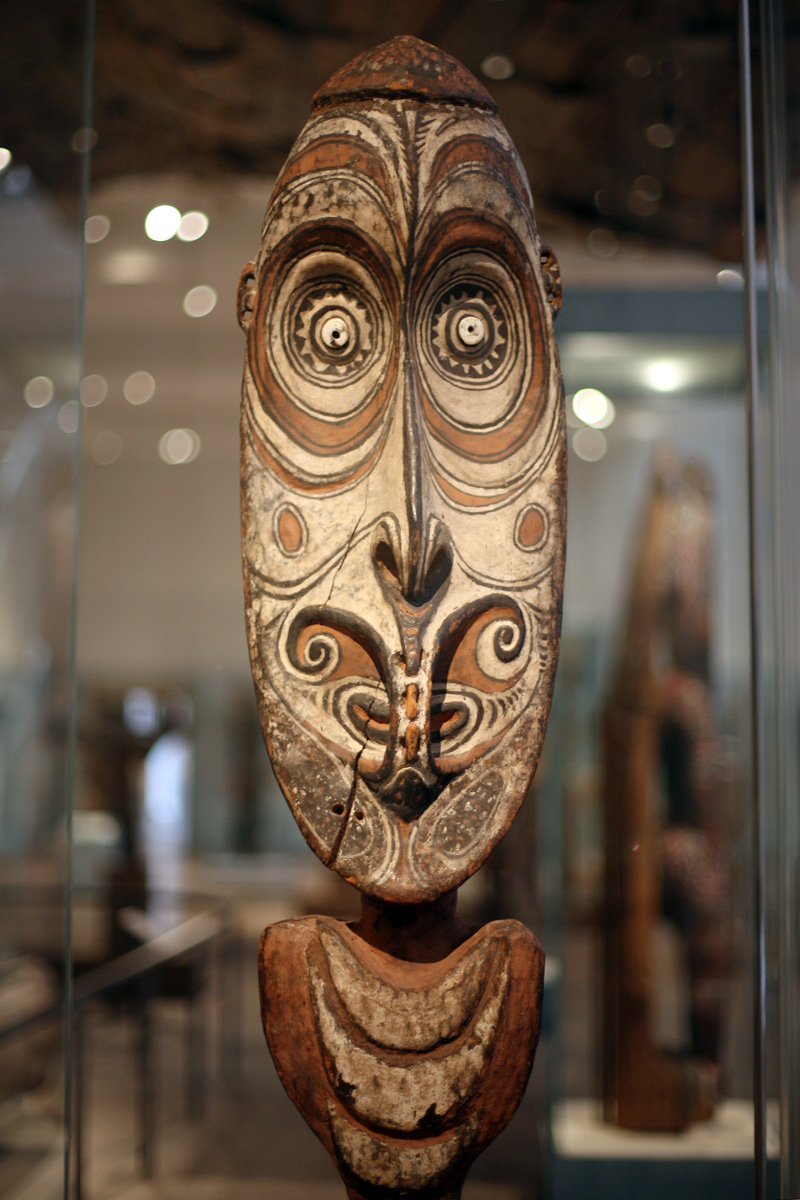
19th–20th century fence element

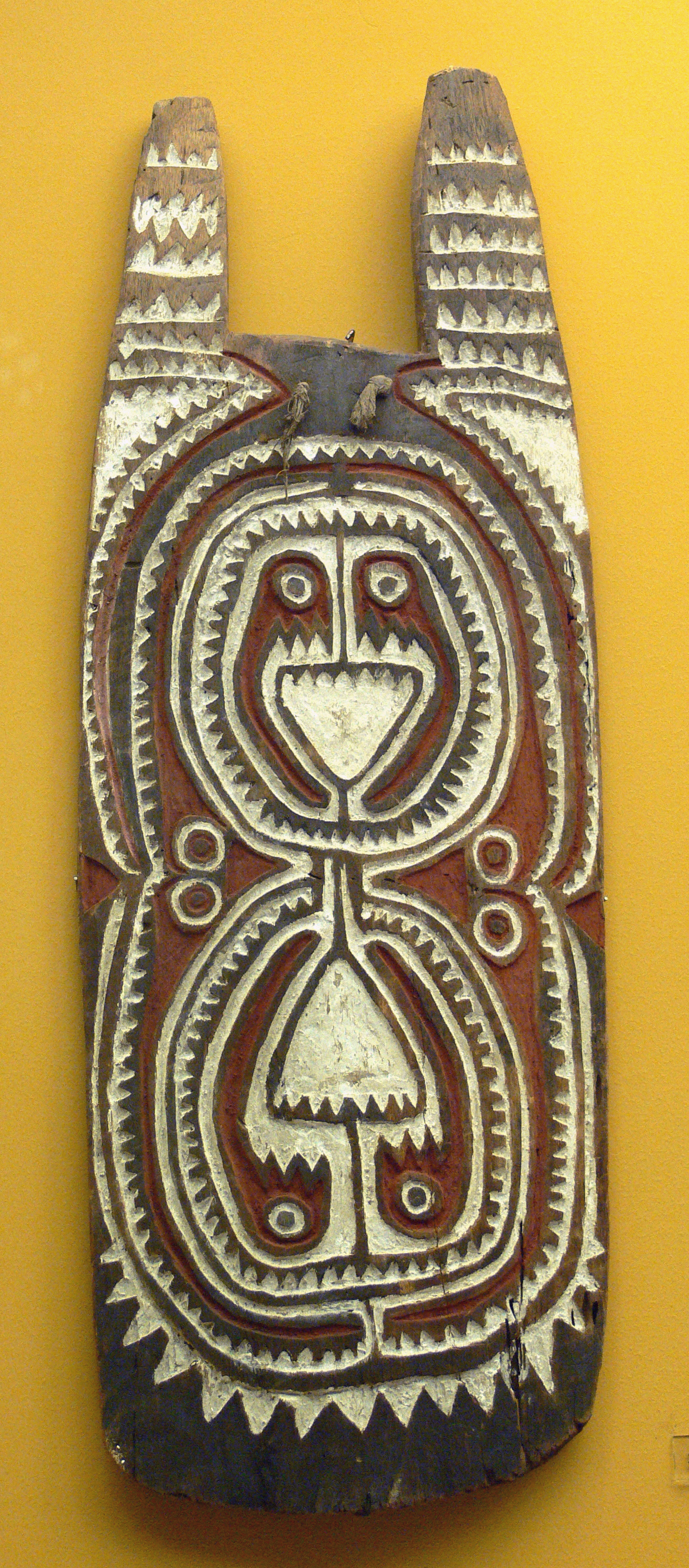
Shield from 1900 collection

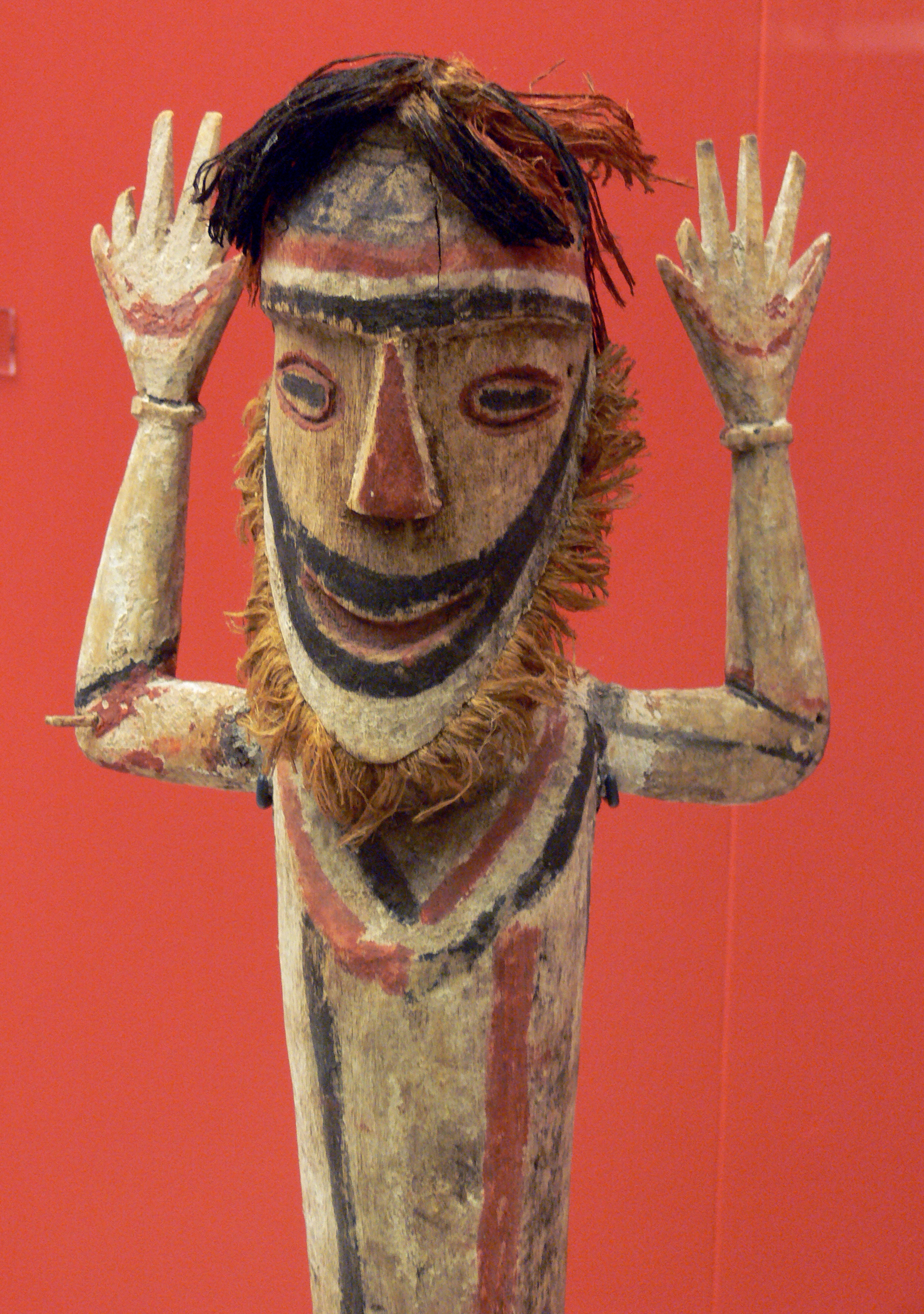
Tolai ancestral wood figure from 1907 collection

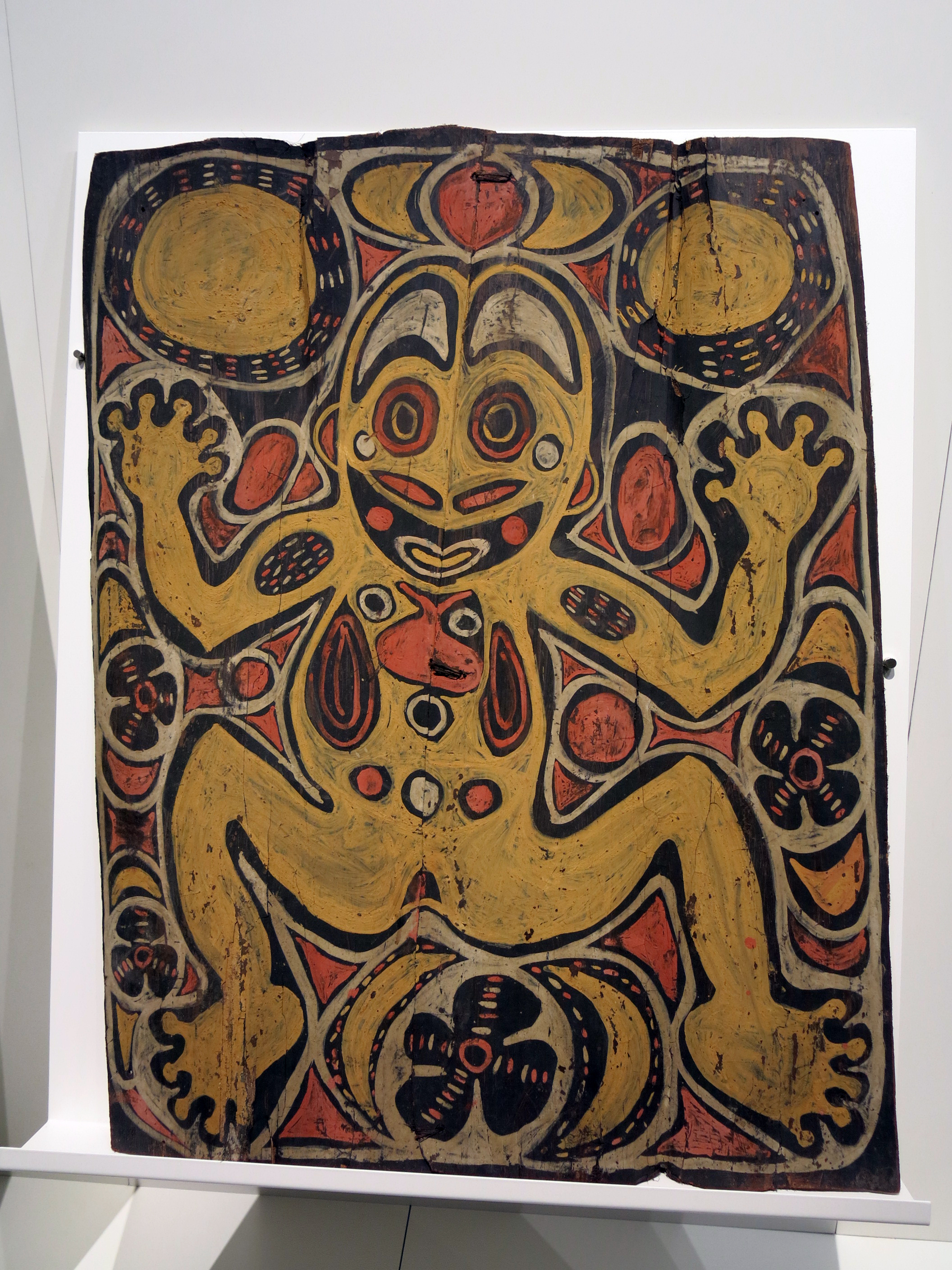
Early 20th–century painting

== See also ==
- Oceanian art
- Culture of Papua New Guinea
- History of Papua New Guinea
- Sepik art
