= Overmodelled skull =

Human skull covered with various materials

An overmodelled skull is a skull covered with various materials to reconstruct the appearance of a human head. This technique of art and religion is described in many countries throughout the ages.

== Origins ==
A custom that has existed since the Neolithic era, it is widespread in Oceania and the Near East. It originated as a cult of ancestors and consists of covering the dry skull with a plastic material, such as earth, clay, ash, plaster or lime. Skulls can be embellished with pigments, jewellery etc. Sometimes, skulls of animals are also over-modelled.

== Gallery ==
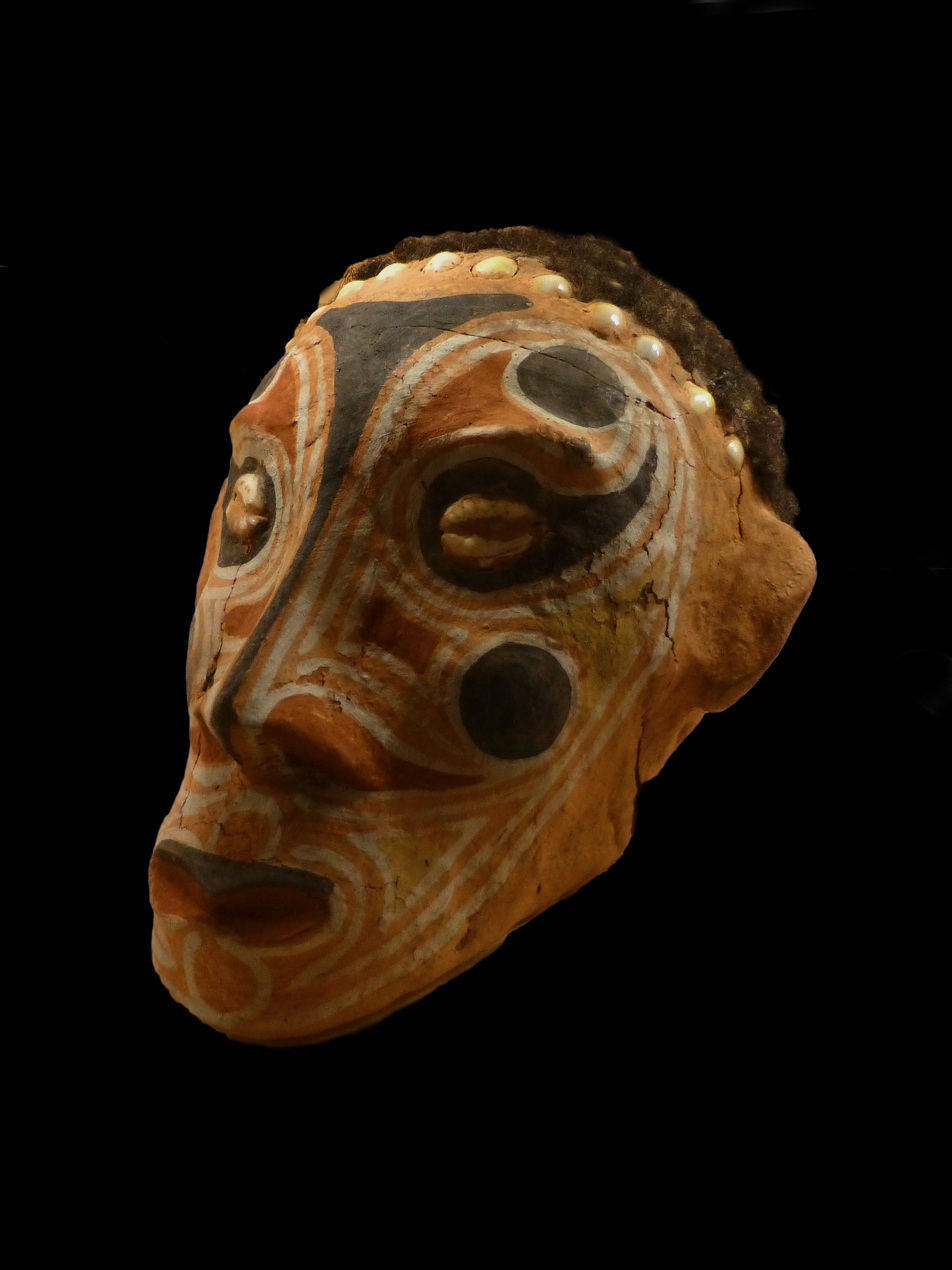
Overmodelled skull, Vanuatu.

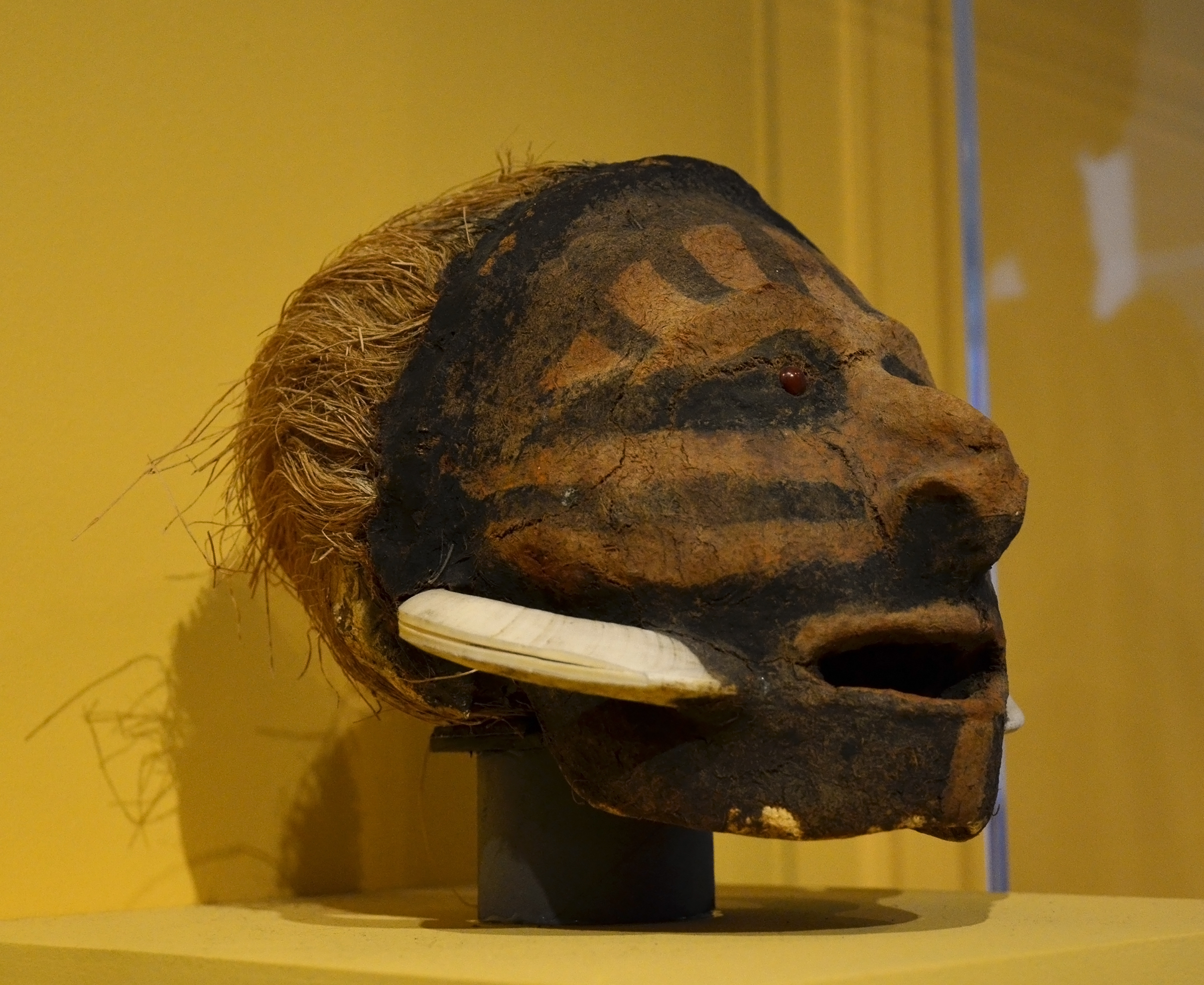
Overmodelled skull, Vanuatu.

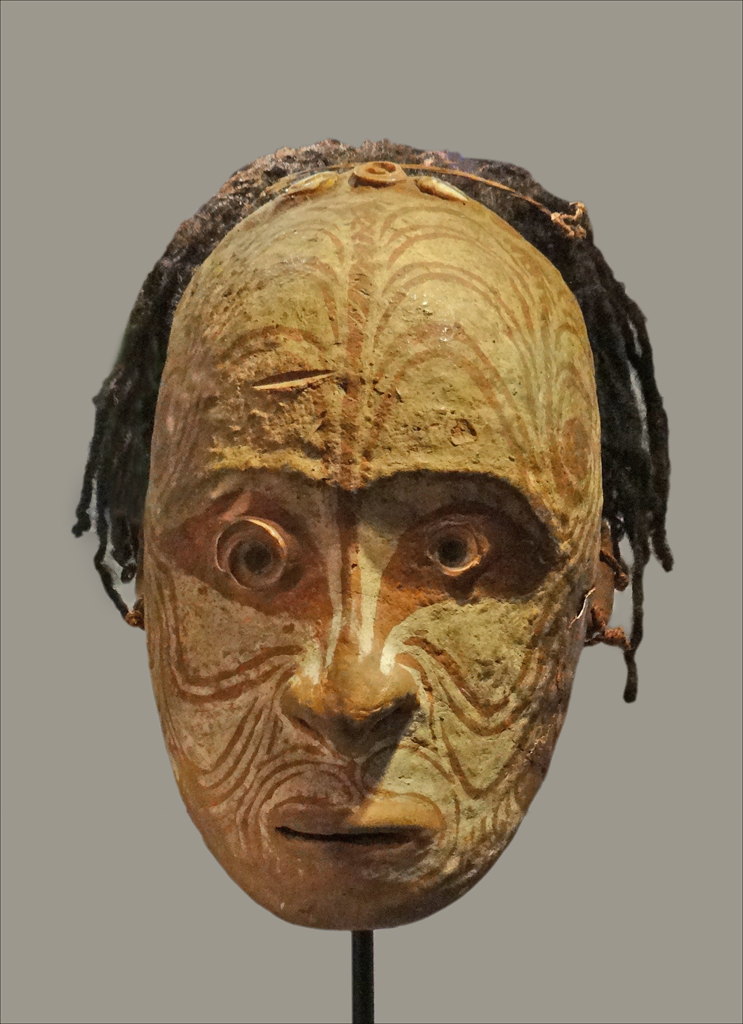
Skull in the musée du quai Branly.

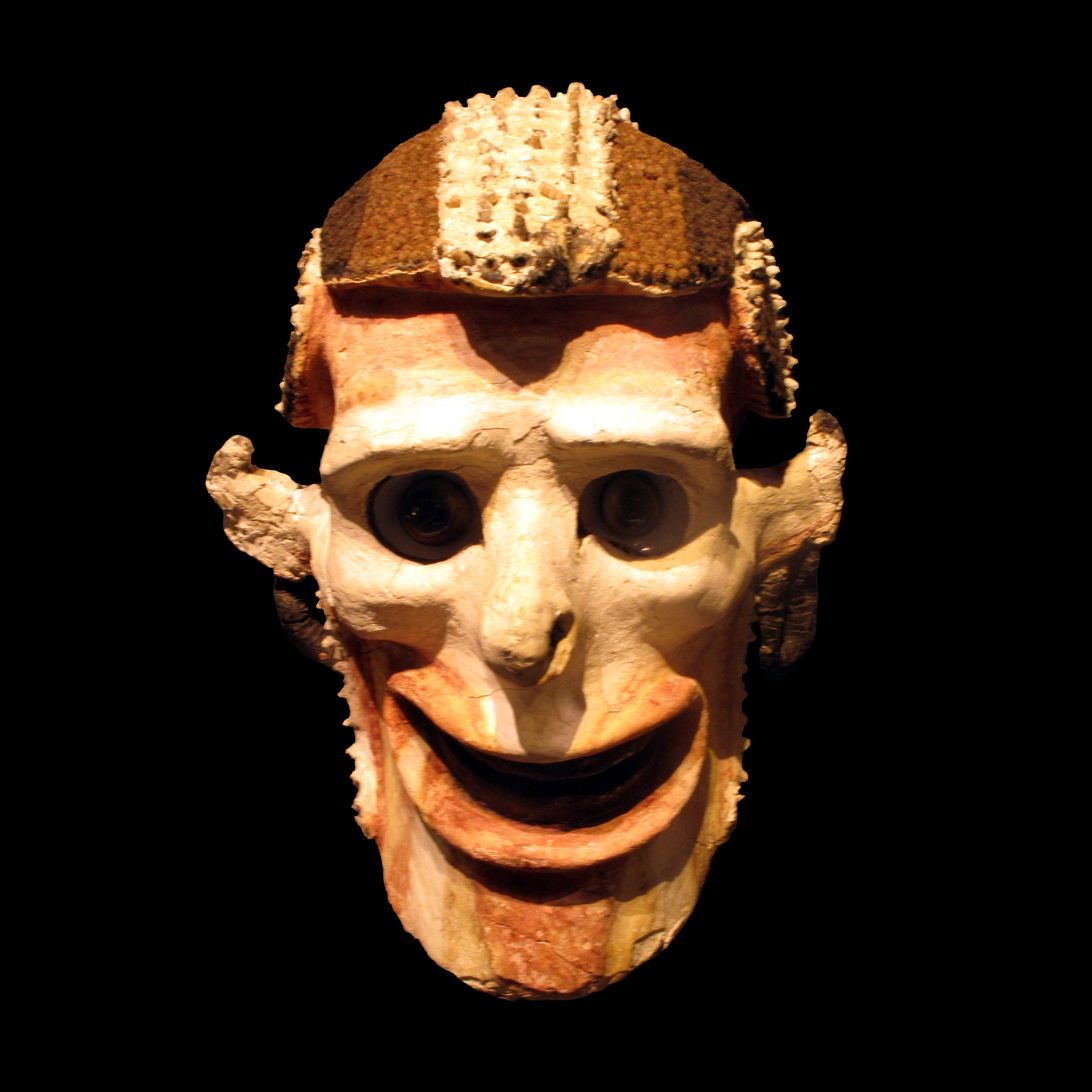
Skull in the musée d'ethnographie de Genève, 19th.

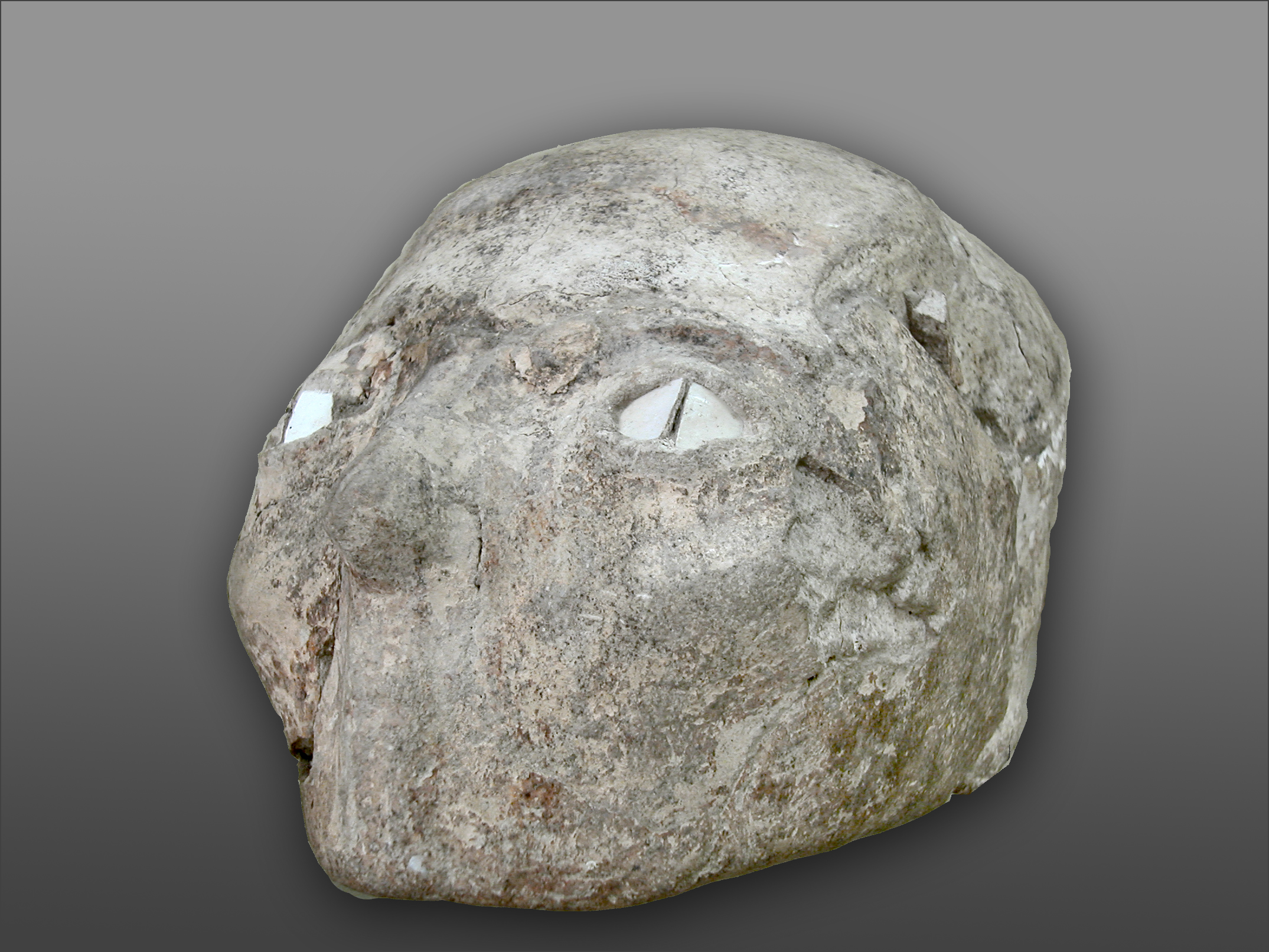
Overmodelled skull in Amman, neolithic era.

== Articles annexes ==
- Skull
- Papua New Guinean art
- Plastered human skulls

== Bibliography ==
- Alain Nicolas, Art papou, Nouvelles Éditions Scala, Paris, 2000 & L'art papou : Austronésiens et Papous de Nouvelle-Guinée (catalogue d'exposition, Musée de Marseille, 2000.
- Maxime Rovere, Magali Melandri, Rouge kwoma : peintures mythiques de Nouvelle-Guinée : exposition, Paris, Musée du quai Branly, 14 octobre 2008-4 janvier 2009, Réunion des musées nationaux : Musée du quai Branly, Paris, 2009, ISBN 978-2-915133-93-6.
- Objets de pouvoir en Nouvelle-Guinée (in French). Saint-Germain-en-Laye: Réunion des musées nationaux : musée d'Archéologie nationale. 2006.
- Anthony JP Meyer, Oceanic Art, Könemann, 1995.
- Arthur C. Aufderheide, Overmodeled Skulls, Heide Press, 2009
