= Oceanian art =

Artistic traditions of Oceania

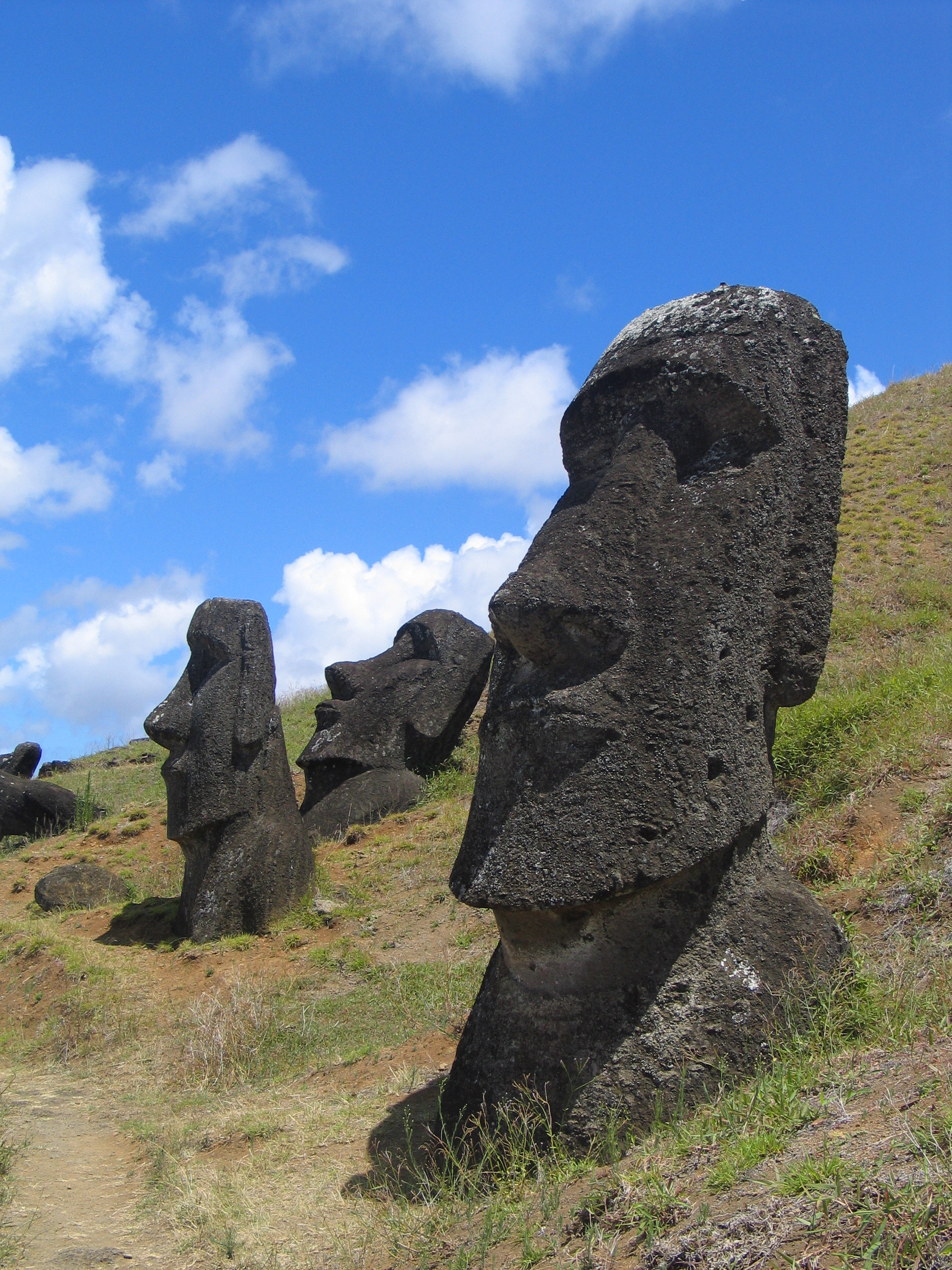
Moai at Rano Raraku, Rapa Nui (Easter Island)

Oceanian art or Oceanic art comprises the creative works made by the native people of the Pacific Islands and Australia, including areas as far apart as Hawaii and Easter Island. Specifically it comprises the works of the two groups of people who settled the area, though during two different periods. They would in time however, come to interact and together reach even more remote islands. The area is often broken down into four separate regions: Micronesia, Melanesia, Polynesia and Australia. Australia, along with interior Melanesia (Papua), are populated by descendants of the first waves of human migrations into the region by Australo-Melanesians. Micronesia, Island Melanesia, and Polynesia, on the other hand, are descendants of later Austronesian voyagers who intermixed with native Australo-Melanesians; mostly via the Neolithic Lapita culture. All of the regions in later times would be greatly affected by western influence and colonization. In more recent times, the people of Oceania have found a greater appreciation of their region's artistic heritage.

The artistic creations of these people varies greatly throughout the cultures and regions. The subject matter typically carries themes of fertility or the supernatural. Art such as masks were used in religious ceremonies or social rituals. Petroglyphs, Tattooing, painting, wood carving, stone carving and textile work are other common art forms. Contemporary Pacific art is alive and well, encompassing traditional styles, symbols, and materials, but now imagined in a diversity of contemporary forms, revealing the complexity of geographic, cultural and individual interaction and history.

== Overview ==
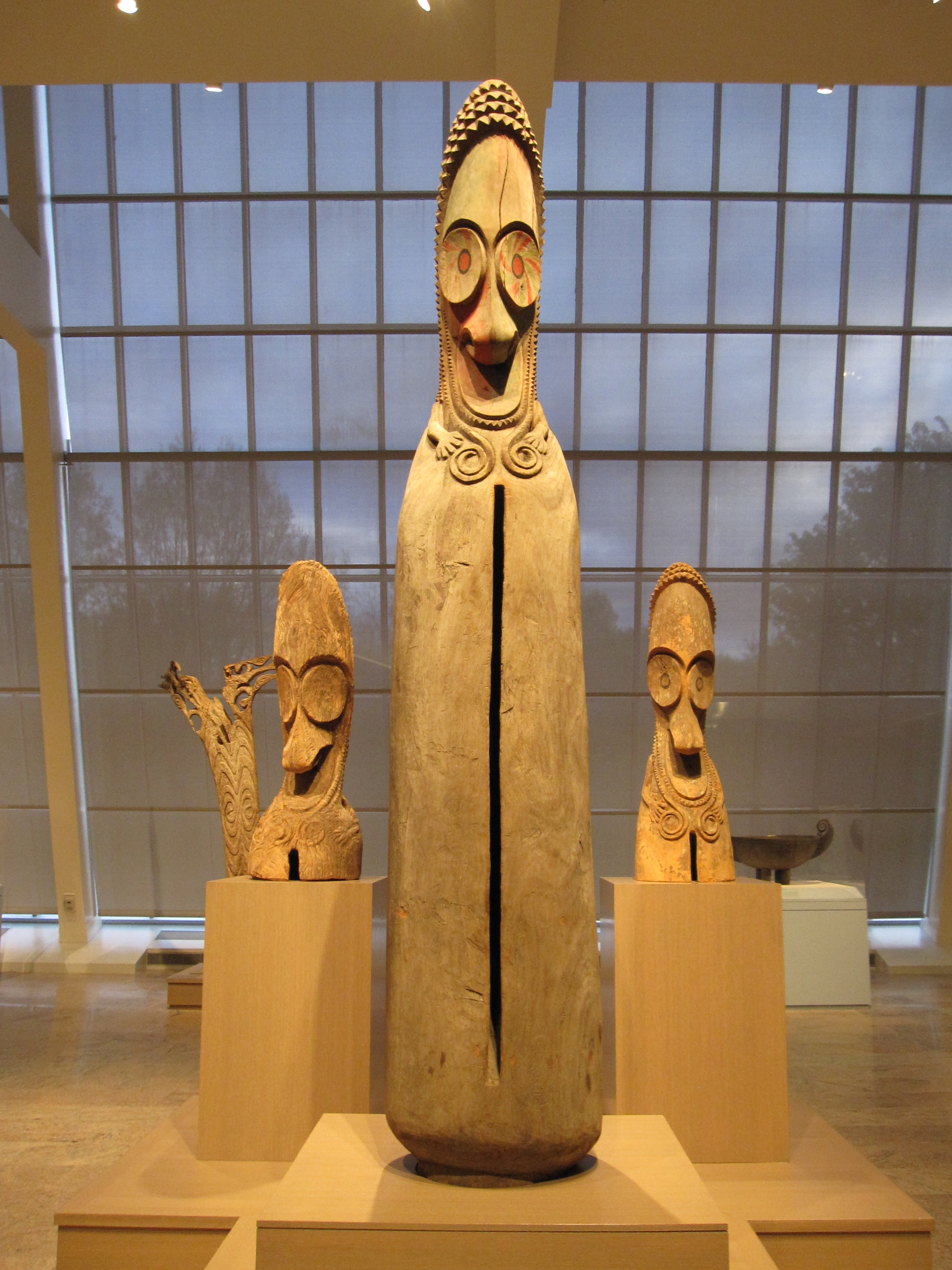
Split gong figures from Vanuatu

Art of Oceania properly encompasses the artistic traditions of the people indigenous to Australia, New Zealand, and the Pacific Islands. The ancestors of the people of these islands came from Southeast Asia by two different groups at separate times. The first, an Australo-Melanesian people and the ancestors of modern-day Melanesians and Australian Aboriginals, came to New Guinea and Australia about 40,000 to 60,000 years ago. The Melanesians expanded as far as the northern Solomon Islands by 38,000 BC. The second wave, the ocean-voyaging Austronesian peoples from Southeast Asia, would not come for another 30,000 years. They would come to interact and together reach even the most remote Pacific islands. These early peoples lacked a writing system, and made works on perishable materials, so few records of them exist from this time. Oceanic peoples traditionally did not see their work in the western concept of "art", but rather created objects for the practical purpose of use in religious or social ceremonies, or for use in everyday life.

Map showing the migration and expansion of the Austronesian peoples in the Indo-Pacific

By 1500 BC the Austronesian Lapita culture, descendants of the second wave, would begin to expand and spread into the more remote islands. At around the same time, art began to appear in New Guinea, including the earliest examples of sculpture in Oceania. The period from 1000 BC on, the Lapita people would consolidate and begin to create the contemporary Polynesian cultures of Samoa, Tonga, and Fiji. They would from there venture further out into the Pacific and settle the Marquesas and Northern Cook Islands between 200 BC and 1 AD. Additionally from about 1000 BC, trade between the Pacific Islands and mainland Asia was growing, and starting 600 BC, works of the Dongson culture of Vietnam, known for their bronze working, can be found in Oceania, and their imagery has a strong influence on the indigenous artistic tradition. Records to 1000 AD continue to be few, however most artistic tradition are continued to this point, such as New Guinea sculpture and Australian rock art, although the period is characterized by increasing trade and interaction as well as new areas being settled, including Hawaii, Easter Island, Tahiti, and New Zealand. Starting around 1100 AD, the people of Easter Island would begin construction of nearly 900 moai (large stone statues). At about 1200 AD, the people of Pohnpei, a Micronesian island, would embark on another megalithic construction, building Nan Madol, a city of artificial islands and a system of canals. By 1500, the first European explorers begin to reach Oceania. Although previous artistic and architectural traditions are continued, the various regions would begin to diverge and record more distinct cultures.

== Prehistoric ==
The rock art of First Australians is the longest continuously practiced artistic tradition in the world. These sites, found in Arnhem Land, Australia, are divided into three periods: Pre-Estuarine (c. 40,000?–6000 BC), Estuarine (c. 6000 BC–500 AD), and Fresh Water (c. 500 AD–present). They are dated based on the styles and content of the art. Pre-Estuarine, the oldest, is characterized by imagery in a red ocher pigment. However, by about 6000 BC, increasingly elaborate images begin to appear, marking the beginning of the Estuarine period. These rock paintings served several functions. Some were used in magic, others to increase animal populations for hunting, while some were simply for amusement. One of the more elaborate collections of rock art in this area is the site of Ubirr, a favored camping ground during wet seasons which has had its rock faces painted many times over thousands of years. Sculpture in Oceania first appears on New Guinea as a series of stone figures found throughout the island, but mostly in mountainous highlands. Establishing a chronological timeframe for these pieces in most cases is difficult, but one has been dated to 1500 BC. The content of the sculptures fit into three categories: mortars, pestles, and freestanding figures. The tops of many pestles contain images, often of birds or human heads. Mortars show similar imagery, or sometimes geometric patterns. Freestanding figures again portray similar themes: humans, animals, and phalluses. The original significance of these pieces however, are unknown, but were perhaps used in the context of rituals.

Another early culture with an artistic tradition are the Lapita, dating from about 1500 BC to 500 BC, who are thought to be the ancestors of the modern day cultures of Polynesia and Island Melanesia. The culture was formed by the second wave of Oceanic settlers. The name comes from the site of Lapita in New Caledonia, which was among the first places its distinctive sculpture would be found. It is debated exactly where the culture developed, but the people themselves originally came from Southeast Asia. Their art is best known by its ceramics, which include elaborate geometric motifs and sometimes anthropomorphic imagery. It is thought some of the designs may be related to modern Polynesian tattoos and barkcloths. They were created by firing a comblike tool that stamped the designs on to wet clay. Each stamp would have one design and would be layered until an elaborate pattern was created. Their usage was primarily, in cooking, serving, and storing food.

== Regional ==
=== Micronesia ===
Micronesia comprises second-wave settlers of Oceania, encompassing the people of the islands north of Melanesia, and has an artistic tradition attested to early Austronesian waves from the Philippines and the Lapita culture. Among the most prominent works of the region is the megalithic floating city of Nan Madol. The city began in 1200 AD, and is still being built when European explorers begin to arrive around 1600. The city however, undergoes a decline by around 1800 along with the Saudeleur dynasty, and is abandoned altogether by the 1820s. The 19th century would see the region divided up amongst the colonial powers, however art continued to thrive. Wood carving by men in particular flourishes in the region, creating richly decorated ceremonial houses in Belau, stylized bowls, canoe ornaments, ceremonial vessels, and sometimes sculptured figures. Women on the other hand created textiles and ornaments like bracelets and headbands. Stylistically, Micronesian art is streamlined and of a practical simplicity to its function, but is typically finished to a high standard of quality. This was mostly to make the best possible use of what few natural materials they had available to them.

The first half of the 20th century saw a downturn in Micronesia's cultural integrity and a strong foreign influence from both western and Japanese Imperialist powers. A number of historical artistic traditions, especially sculptural, simply ceased to be practiced. However other art forms continued, including traditional architecture and weaving. But by the second half of the century, independence from colonial powers allows their traditional arts to find a renewed interest and respect from within the region, and a new generation are taught these art forms. There is also a notable movement of contemporary art within Micronesia toward the end of the 20th century.

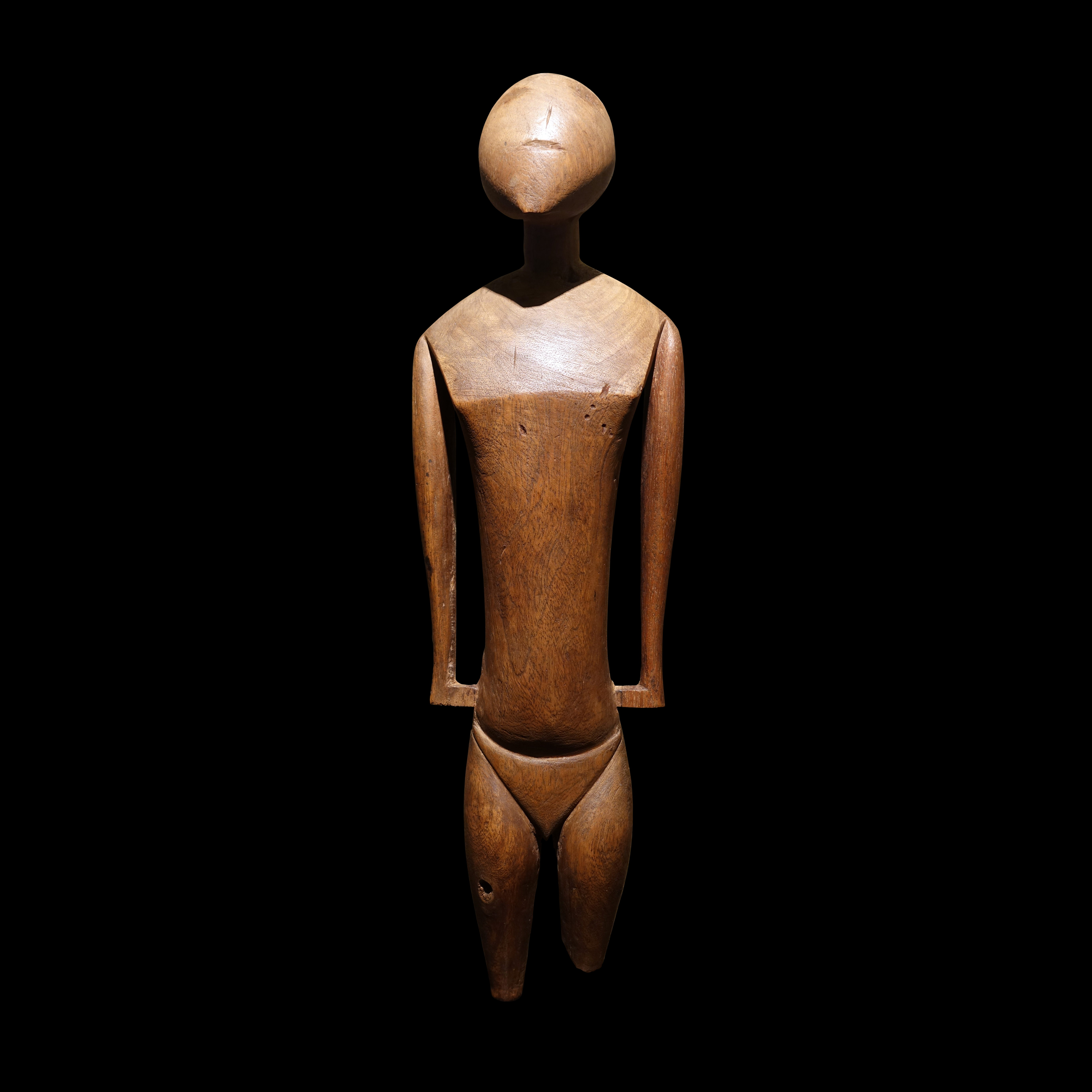
Dinonga eidu (idol); circa 1800; wood; height: 35 cm (13 3/4 in.); from the Caroline islands; Musée du quai Branly (Paris)

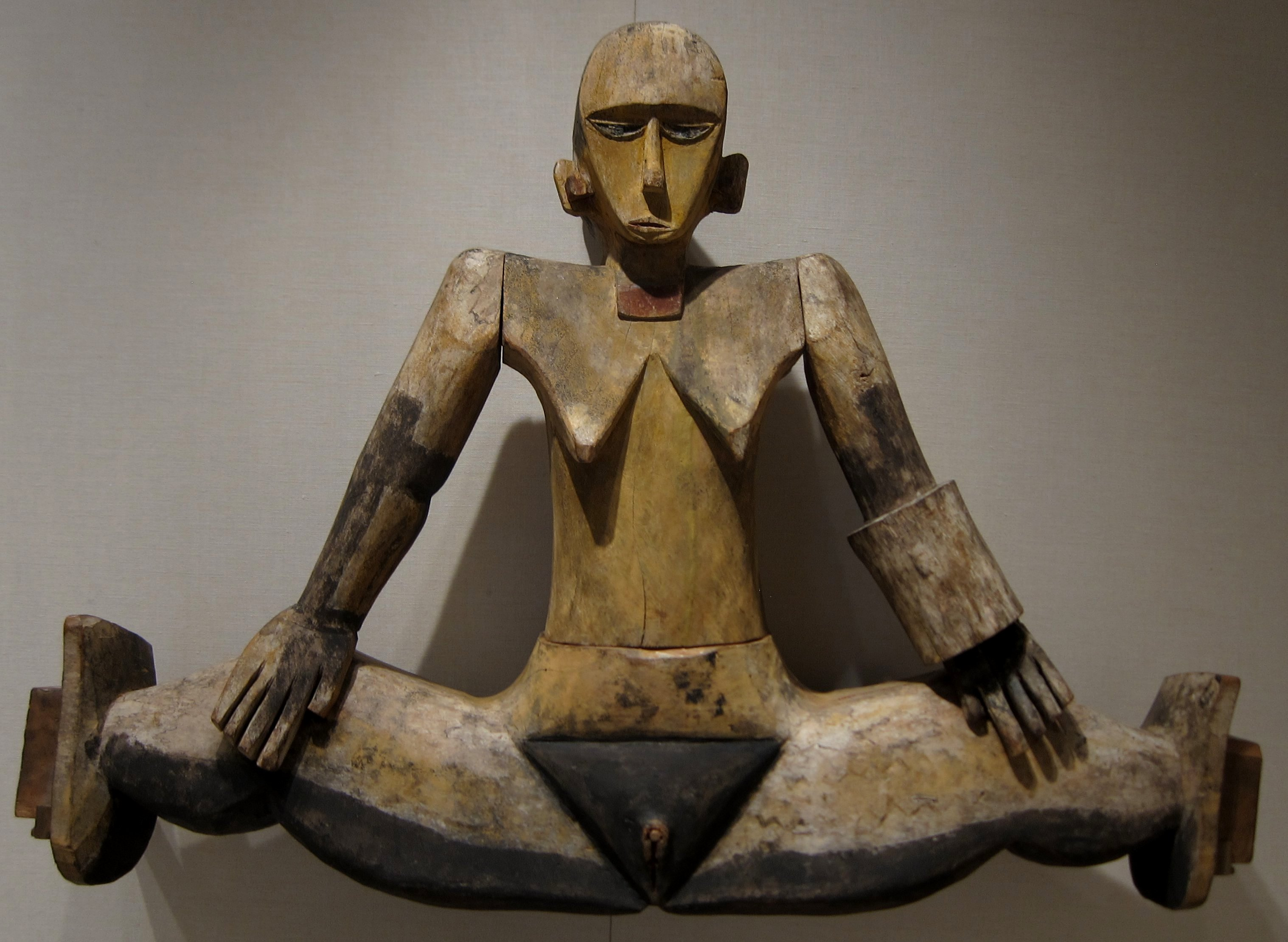
Gable figure (dilukái); late 19th century-early 20th century; painted wood; height: 65.2 cm (25 2/3 in.); from Palau, by Belauan people; Metropolitan Museum of Art (New York City)

=== Polynesia ===
Birdmen (Tangata manu) paintings in a cave at the foot of Rano Kau, Rapa Nui (Easter island).

Polynesia, like Micronesia, stretched back to Lapita cultural traditions. Lapita Culture included parts of the western Pacific and reached as far east as Tonga and Samoa. However much of Polynesia, like the islands of Hawaii, New Zealand, Tahiti, and Easter Island, had only relatively recently been settled by indigenous peoples. The most famous Polynesian art forms are the Moai (statues) of Rapa Nui/Easter Island. Polynesian art is characteristically ornate, and often meant to contain supernatural power or mana. Polynesian works of art were thought to contain spiritual power and could effect change in the world. However the period beyond 1600 AD had seen intense interaction with European explorers, in addition to continuing earlier cultural traditions. The collections of European explorers during the period show that classical Polynesian art was indeed flourishing. In the 19th century, depopulation of areas due to slave raiding and Western diseases disrupted many societies and cultures. Missionary work in the region caused the conversion to Christianity, and in some cases the destruction of traditional cultural and artistic heritage of the region, specifically sculpture. However more secular art forms continue, such as carving non-religious objects like kava bowls and textile work such as tapa making. With the end of colonialism however, Polynesians increasingly attempted to assert their cultural identity.

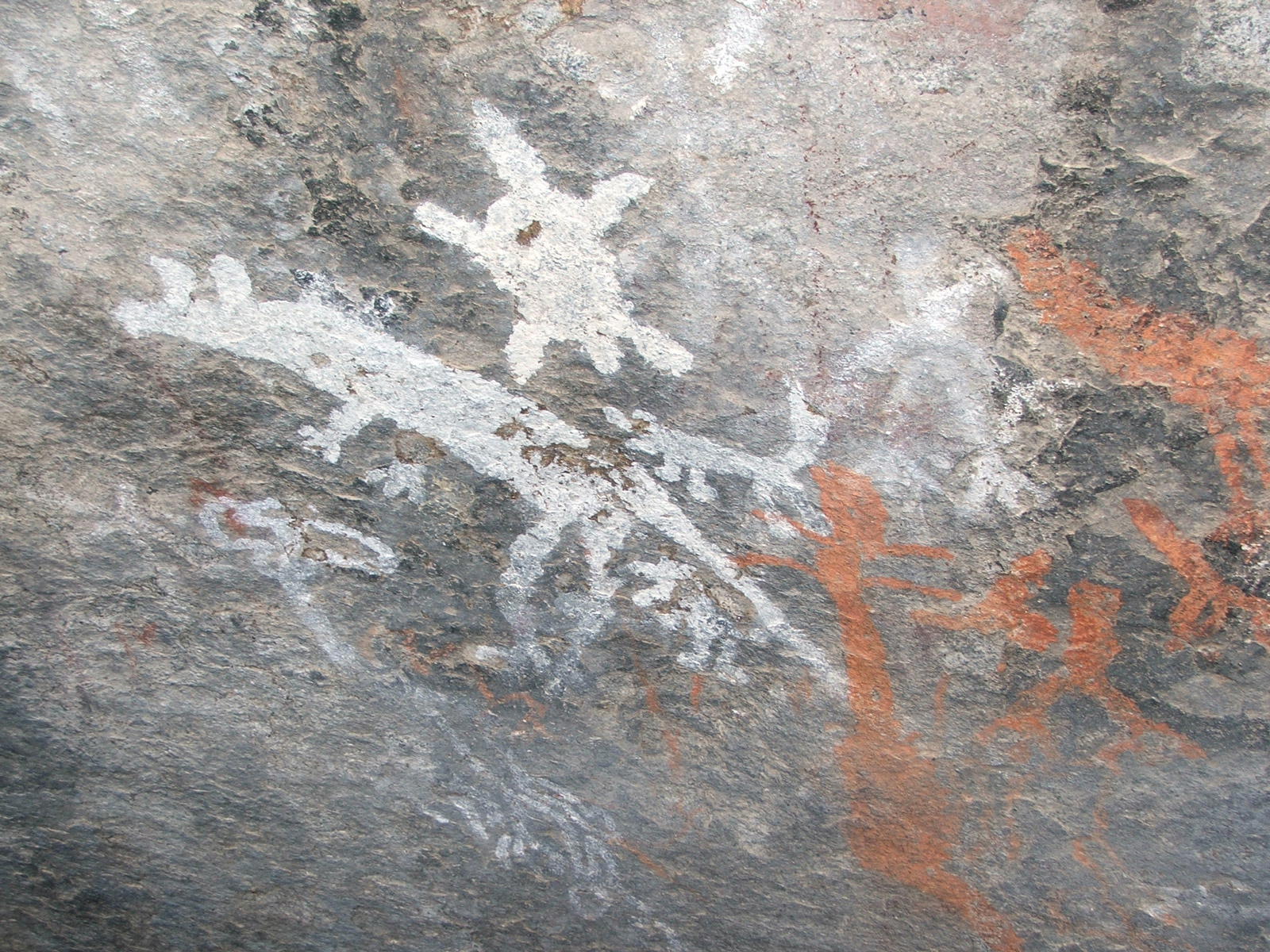
Australian Aboriginal rock painting from Namadgi National Park

=== Australia ===
Australian First Nations people are most known for their rock art, which they continue to practice after their contact with Western explorers. Other forms of art however, reflect their lifestyle of often moving from one camp to another and is utilitarian and portable, albeit still highly decorated. They used rocks and other natural sources mixed with water to make their paint. Often using sticks to make their famous but recent (from 1971) dot paintings. Even today we still see First Nations people making these. When dancing, they paint their bodies with white "paint" and apply it to their body in patterns and meaningful shapes and lines. Their dancing uses native Australian animals as inspiration.

=== Melanesia ===
Melanesia, comprising New Guinea and the surrounding islands and people of first wave settlers, has perhaps the most striking art of all Oceania. Stylistically art is typically highly decorative and portrays exaggerated forms, often of sexual themes. It is mostly made in connection with ancestors, hunting, and cannibalism. Commonly they would be used in the context of spiritual rituals, such as the creation of elaborate masks. However, few examples of Melanesian art exist on the islands today.

After 1600, like the other regions of Oceania, Melanesia saw increasing encounters with European explorers. What they witnessed was a flourishing tradition of art and culture, such as the first record of the region's elaborate wood carving. It isn't until the latter half of the 19th century, however, that westernization begins to takes its toll. Some traditional forms of art go into decline, but others like sculpture survive and even thrive in the region. Not until more of the islands were explored by the western powers that the sheer diversity of Melanesian art begins to be seen. By the 20th century, Melanesian art begins to find its way to the West and has a profound impact on contemporary artists. However a great cultural disruption would follow the second World War, and much traditional art would begin to decline or be destroyed. This would be followed decades later by a newfound appreciation for their native art forms.

== See also ==
- Oceanian culture
- Austronesian culture
- Tribal art
- Overmodelled skull
