= Culture of Papua New Guinea =

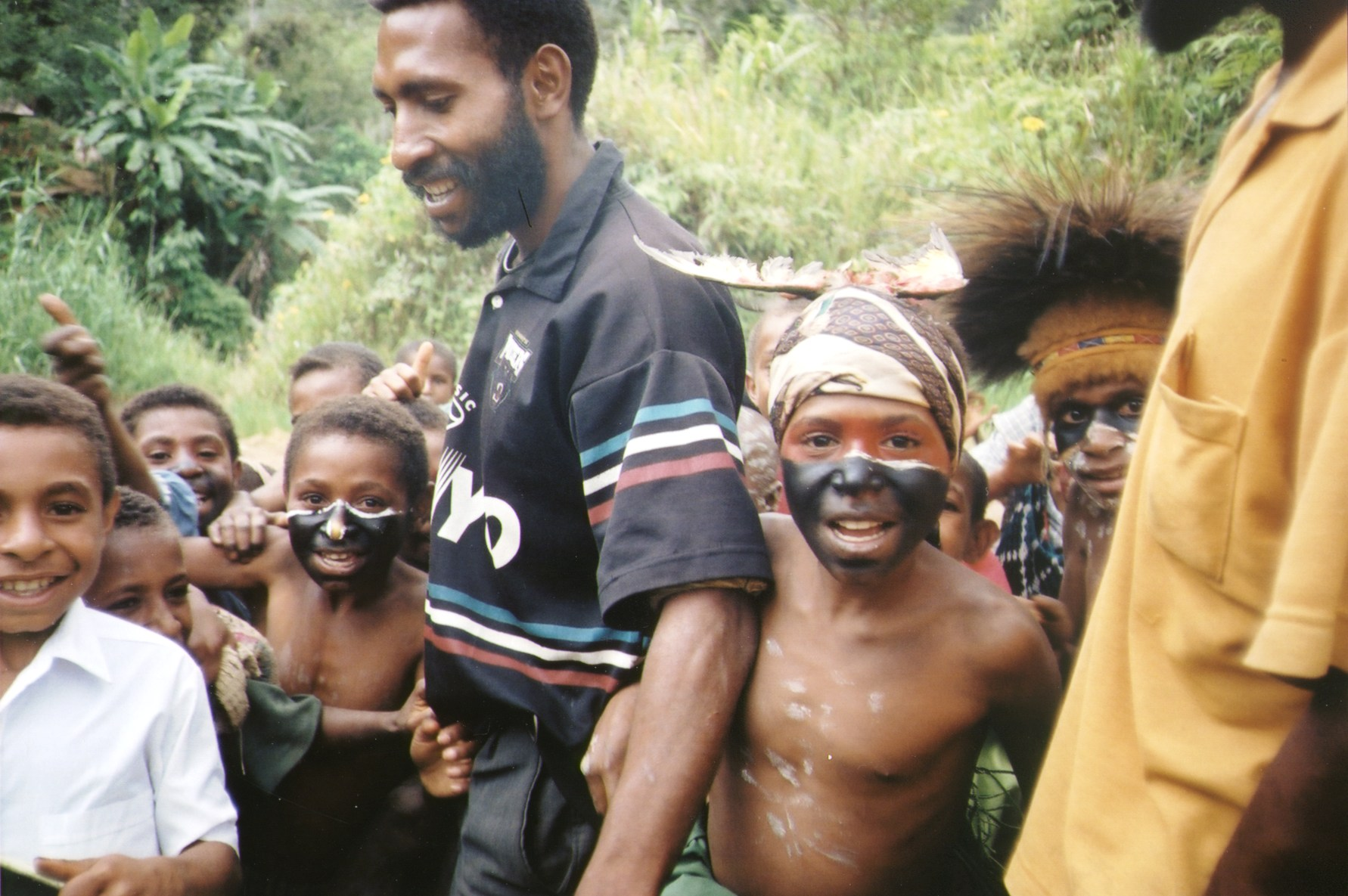
Children dressed up for sing-sing in Yengisa, Papua New Guinea

The culture of Papua New Guinea is complex and multifaceted. It is estimated that more than 1000 different cultural groups exist in Papua New Guinea, and most groups have their own language. Because of this diversity, in which they take pride, many different styles of cultural expression have emerged; each group has created its own expressive forms in art, dance, weaponry, costumes, singing, music, architecture and much more. To unify the nation, the language Tok Pisin, once called Neo-Melanesian (or Pidgin English) has evolved as the lingua franca — the medium through which diverse language groups are able to communicate with one another in Parliament, in the news media, and elsewhere. People typically live in villages or dispersed hamlets which rely on the subsistence farming of yams and taro. The principal livestock in traditional Papua New Guinea is the oceanic pig (Sus papuensis).

== Traditions ==
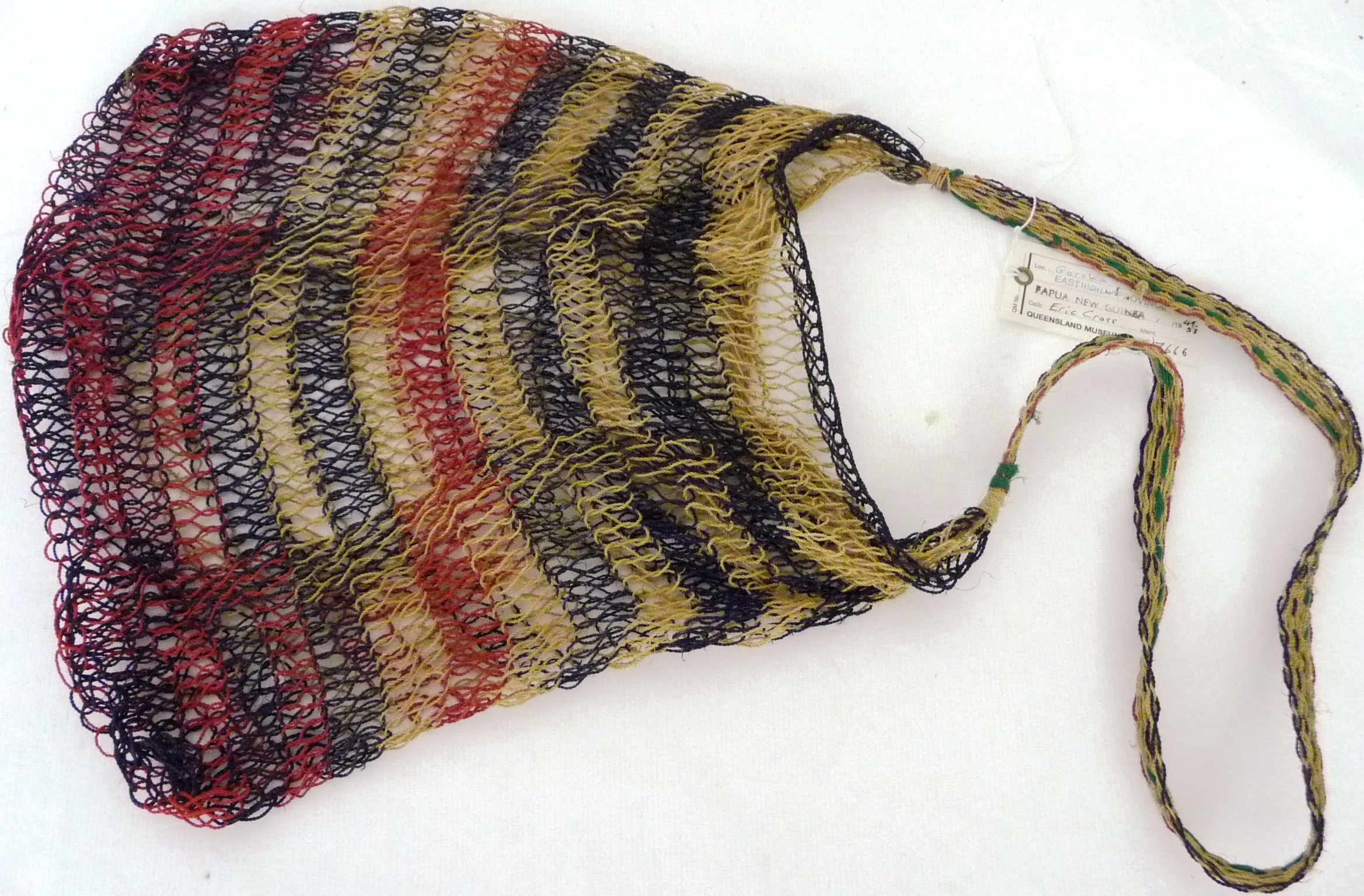
Bilum bag from Goroka, Eastern Highlands Province

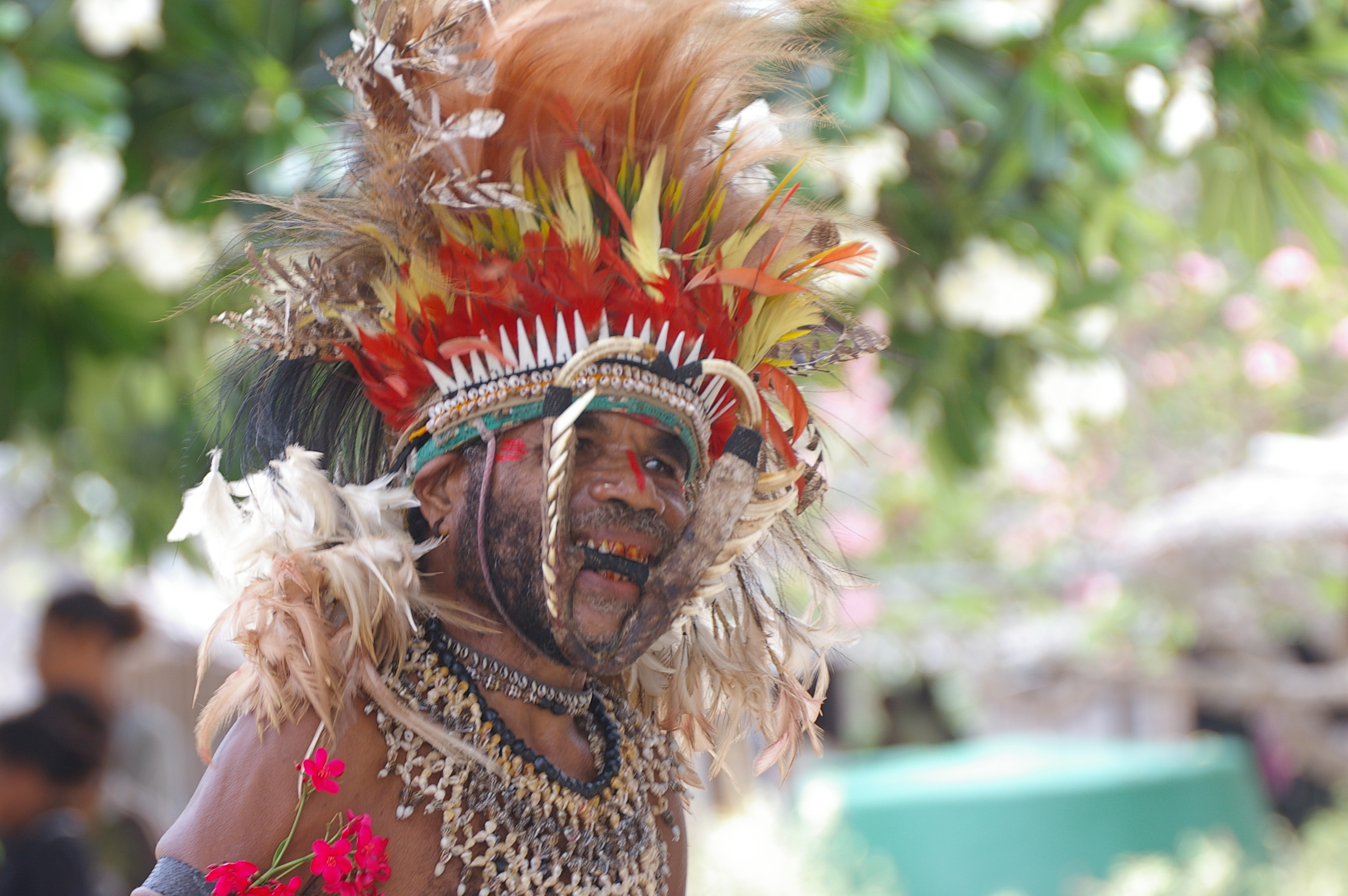
A resident of Boga-Boga, a village on the southeast coast of mainland Papua New Guinea

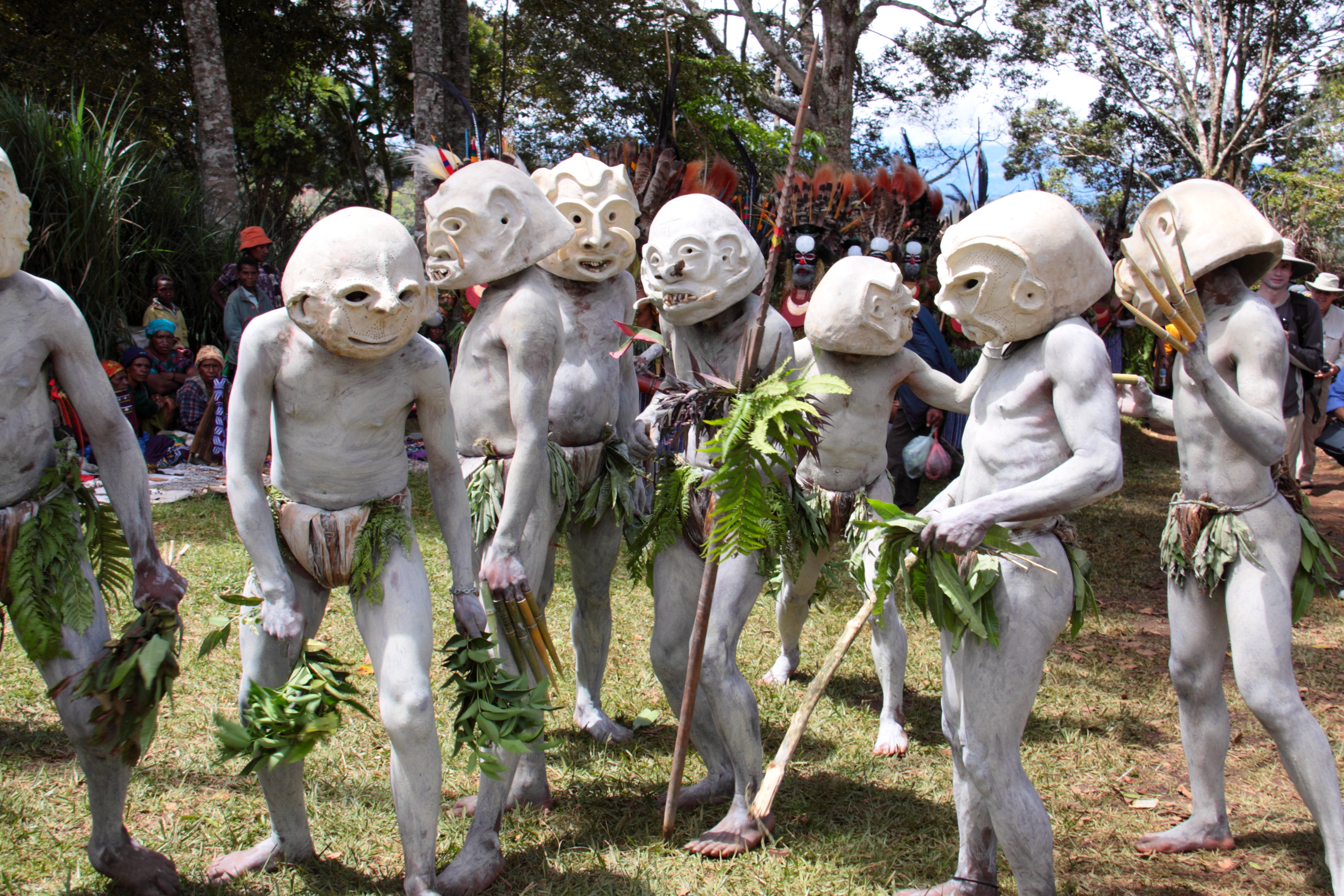
Asaro Mudmen

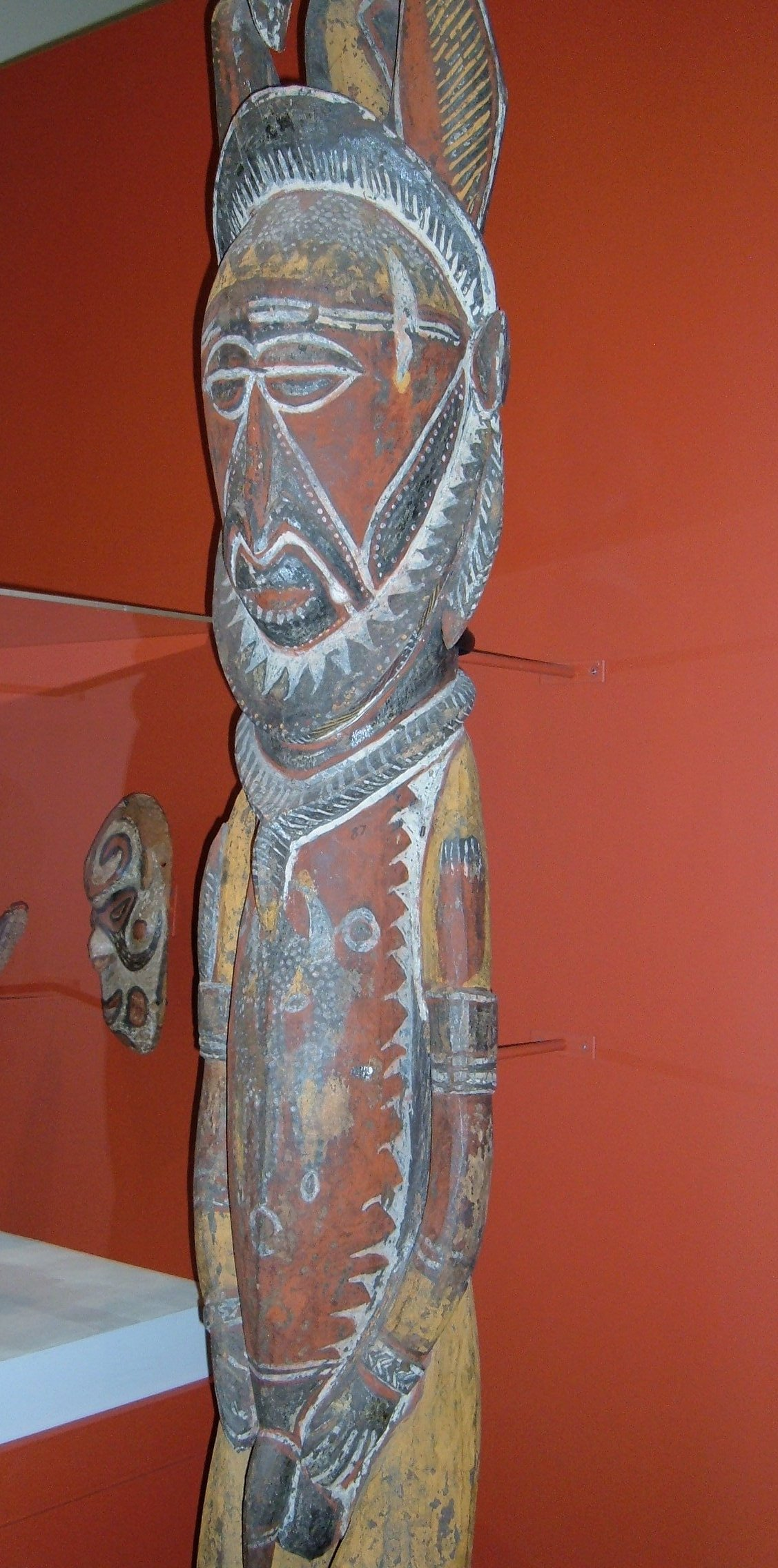
A 20th-century wooden Abelam ancestor figure (nggwalndu)

Melanesian culture developed without significant external influence due to the isolation of New Guinea for much of history. This culture places significant importance on relationships, both between people and between a person and aspects of the natural environment. The importance of relationships is seen in the Kula ring trade, where items are traded to maintain relationships rather than for direct economic benefit. Connections to and ownership of land are important, although these are generally on a community level rather than an individual one. Local in-group relations are a strong component of the wantok system, and so treatment by individuals of those in their communities will often differ from the way they treat those of other communities. The value of actions is often evaluated predominantly or exclusively by impact on one's local community.

The country remains greatly fragmented, with strong local identities and allegiances that often contrast with a weak national identity. It is estimated that more than one thousand cultural groups exist in Papua New Guinea. Because of this diversity, many styles of cultural expression have emerged. Each group has created its own expressive forms in art, dance, weaponry, costumes, singing, music, architecture and much more. Most of these cultural groups have their own language. People typically live in villages that rely on subsistence farming. In some areas people hunt and collect wild plants (such as yam roots and karuka) to supplement their diets. Those who become skilled at hunting, farming and fishing earn a great deal of respect.

One joint symbol of national identity is the bird-of-paradise, which is present on the national flag and emblem. Feathers from these birds remain important in traditional ceremonies, and during sing-sing gatherings.

Seashells were a common currency before 1933. In highland areas far from the coast, they were perhaps of greater value than steel. They still retain ceremonial value, for example a bride price may be paid with golden-edged clam shells. In other regions, the bride price is paid in lengths of shell money, pigs, cassowaries or cash. Elsewhere, it is brides who traditionally pay a dowry.

Even though sea shells are no longer the currency of Papua New Guinea - sea shells were abolished as currency in 1933 - this heritage is still present in local customs. In certain parts of the country a groom must bring a bride price to the wedding ceremony. In some cases this is paid in golden-edged clam shells. In other areas, a dowry is payable rather than bride price. These payments may take the form of shell money, food, pigs, cash, or other goods. In some parts of the New Guinea highlands, people engage in colorful local rituals that are called "sing-sings". They paint themselves and dress up with feathers, pearls and animal skins to represent birds, trees or mountain spirits. Sometimes an important event, such as a legendary battle, would be enacted at such a musical festival.

The culture of traditional Melanesian societies sees small communities led under a "big man". These are often considered to be positions earned through merit and societies are thought to be relatively egalitarian, although at times hereditary influence does play a role, and there are varying social stratifications in addition to differences relating to age and gender. Broadly, highland societies were likely more individualistic than lowland societies. As in the traditional big man system the position is expected to be demonstrated in part through the generous dispersion of excess wealth, cultural expectations lead to the use of modern political and economic positions for patronage. The dominance of this system constrains modern gender roles, with the vast majority of politicians and leaders continuing to be men. The difference between men and women is the largest source of inequality in traditional communities. Those who become "big men" may maintain some respect throughout life, although status can be lost if others can outperform them. Kinship may come from expressed ties as well as biological ones. The importance of traditional communities can also clash with the concept of higher levels of authority.

People of the highlands engage in colourful local rituals that are called "sing sings." They paint themselves and dress up with feathers, pearls and animal skins to represent birds, trees or mountain spirits. Sometimes an important event, such as a legendary battle, is enacted at such a musical festival.

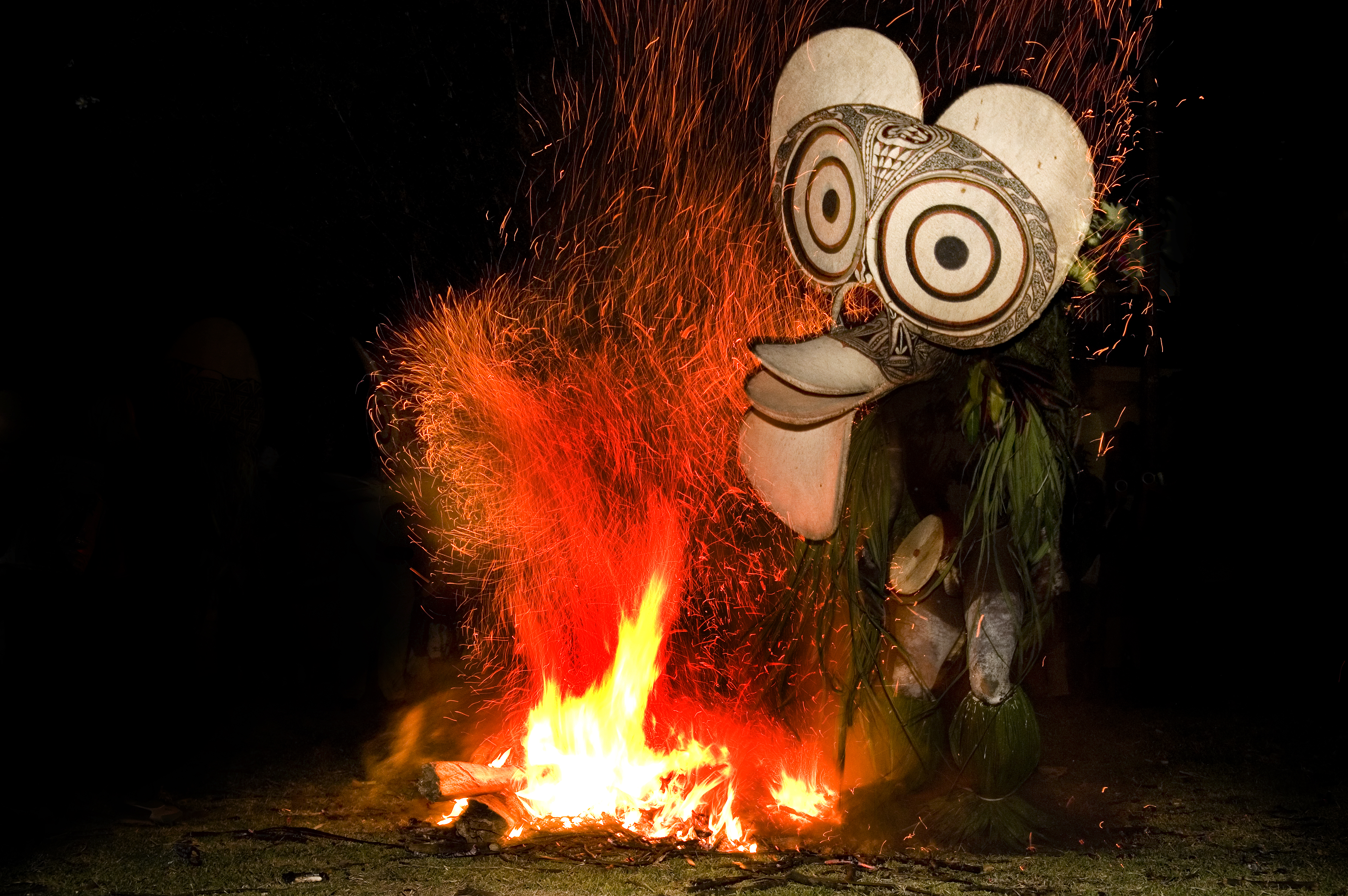
Fire Dancers of the Baining Tribe.

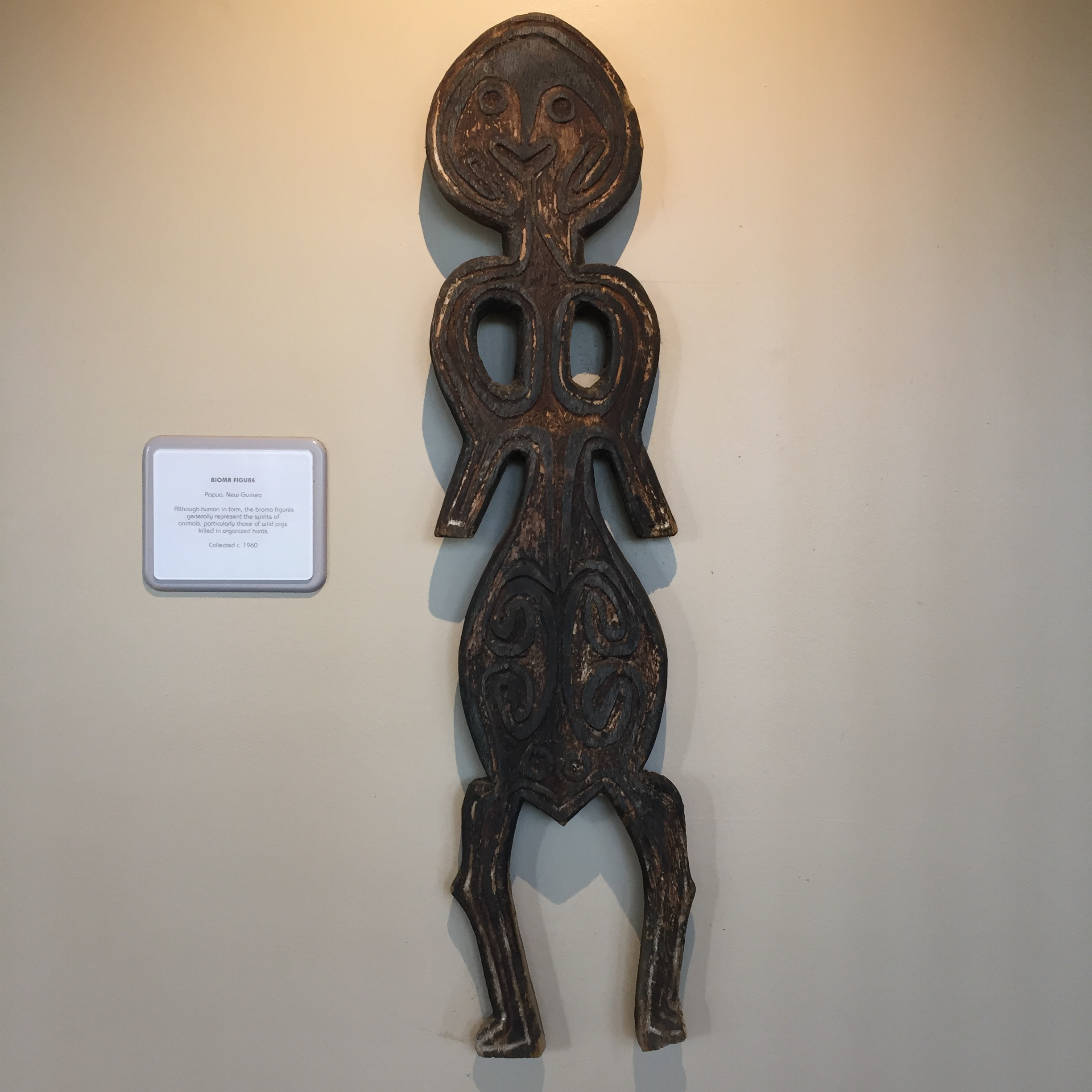
Bioma figures are wood-carved figures from Papua, New Guinea that have human forms but represent the spirit of animals, particularly those of wild pigs killed in organized hunts. Artifact collected in 1960 and is on a display in the corridor of Hotel Hilton Waikoloa Village, Hawaii, USA.

On the Sepik River, there is a world-renowned tradition of wood carving. These carvers create forms of plants or animals, because they believe these are their ancestor beings and because they feel they are beautiful. They also create traditional skull portraits. Also well represented in the collections of museums around the world is the Malagan art tradition of New Ireland.

== Music ==
Well known traditional musical dances include those of the Asaro Mudmen and the Huli people. Music is a common method of passing on cultural knowledge. Common traditional musical instruments include the garamut (a kind of slit drum), the kundu (a single-headed drum), bamboo flutes, and the susap (a mouth-operated lamellophone). Introduced instruments such as guitars and ukeleles became widespread after the Second World War, and bamboo band music spread in the 1970s. Modern music has been heavily influenced by Christian music. Local musical recording have been undertaken since before independence, and the first music video was shown on television in 1990. One early band, Sanguma, formed in 1977 at the National Arts School and toured internationally.

=== Traditional music ===
Song of the "Ujangong" mask dance
Wax cylinder recording from German New Guinea on August 23, 1904, recorded by German anthropologist Rudolf Pöch.

Christian missionaries disapproved of Papuan folk music throughout the colonial period of the country's history. Even after independence, the outside world knew little of the diverse peoples' traditional music genres. The first commercial release to see an international audience didn't occur until 1991 (see 1991 in music), when Mickey Hart's Voices of the Rainforest was released. After 1872, foreigners introduced Christian hymns, including Gregorian chanting. Peroveta anedia, ute and taibubu, all forms of Polynesian music, were also introduced in this period. The Gold Rush brought an influx of Australian miners who brought with them the mouth organ. Traditional celebrations, which include song, dance, feasting and gift-giving, are called singsings. Vibrant and colorful costumes adorn the dancers, while a leader and a chorus sing a staggered approach to the same song, producing a fugue-like effect. 1993 saw television spreading across the country, and American popular music continued to affect Papuan music given the diffusion of radio since WWII. Since 1953, singsings have become competitive in nature, with contests occurring in Port Moresby, Mt. Hagen and Goroka. 1949 saw the first Papuan to achieve international fame, Blasius To Una, begin his career.

=== Popular music ===
Radio broadcasting of western popular music began by the late 1930s. String bands became very popular by the early 1950s, and soon dominated the pop landscape. In the late 1960s, rock bands like the Kopikats had appeared in cities, while string bands like the Paramana Strangers had become well known internationally. This was followed by the importation of bamboo bands, a style of music from the Solomon Islands using bamboo tubes played by hitting them with sandals. It first arrived in the area of Madang in the mid-1970s, and soon spread throughout the country. By the end of the '70s, a local recording industry had appeared and artists like Sanguma and, later, George Telek, began mixing native and Western styles like rock music and jazz.

== Literature ==
A distinct body of Papua New Guinean literature emerged in the leadup to independence, with the first major publication being Ten Thousand Years in a Lifetime, an autobiography by Albert Maori Kiki published in 1968. The government began to actively support literature in 1970, publishing works in multiple languages. Much of this early work was nationalistic and anti-colonial. 1970 saw the beginning of some local newspapers, as well as the publication of the first Papua New Guinean novel: Crocodile by Vincent Eri.

Ulli Beier, a lecturer in English Literature at the University of Papua New Guinea since 1967, was crucial in encouraging young writers and getting their work published. From 1969 to 1974 he was the editor of Kovave, a journal of New Guinea literature. He also published Papua Pocket Poets, and Pidgin Pocket Plays. Kovave ceased publication in 1974 but was replaced by the journal New Guinea Writing although this concentrated on folk tales. Natachee was the first Papuan poet to appear in print. The first autobiography was Albert Maori Kiki's Kiki in 1974. The first novel was Crocodile (1970) by Vincent Eri.

== Visual arts ==
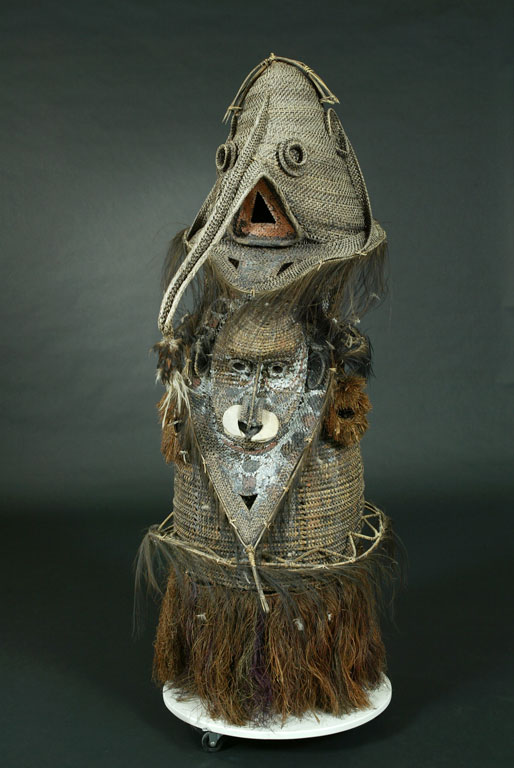
A male spirit dance mask from Kabriman Village, Blackwater River Basin, East Sepik Province, 1960–1973. In the collection of The Children's Museum of Indianapolis

Papua New Guinea has a rich and diverse tradition of visual art. In particular, it is known for carved wooden sculpture: masks, canoes, story-boards. Many of these collections are held in overseas museums. Those identified as being in the first wave of contemporary art in Papua New Guinea are: Mathias Kauage OBE (1944–2003), Timothy Akis, Jakupa Ako and Joe Nalo, all from the tough urban area of Port Moresby. Kauage won Australia's Blake Prize for Religious Art, four of his works are in the Glasgow Museum of Modern Art, and he had a solo show in 2005 at the Horniman Museum, "Kauage's Visions: Art from Papua New Guinea". Other noted Papua New Guinean visual artists include Larry Santana, Martin Morububuna and Heso Kiwi.

== Sport ==
Sport is an important part of Papua New Guinean culture, and rugby league is by far the most popular sport. In a nation where communities are far apart and many people live at a minimal subsistence level, rugby league has been described as a replacement for tribal warfare as a way of explaining the local enthusiasm for the game. Many Papua New Guineans have become celebrities by representing their country or playing in an overseas professional league. Even Australian rugby league players who have played in the annual State of Origin series, which is celebrated every year in PNG, are among the most well-known people throughout the nation. State of Origin is a highlight of the year for most Papua New Guineans, although the support is so passionate that people have died in violent clashes supporting their team. The Papua New Guinea national rugby league team usually plays against the Australian Prime Minister's XIII (a selection of NRL players) each year, normally in Port Moresby.

Although not as popular, Australian rules football is significant in another way, as the national team is ranked second, only after Australia. Other major sports that have a part in the Papua New Guinea sporting landscape are netball, association football, rugby union, basketball and, in eastern Papua, cricket.

Sports are hugely popular in Papua New Guinea, and its citizens participate in and watch a wide variety. Popular sports include various codes of football (rugby league, rugby union, association football, and Australian rules football), cricket, volleyball, softball, netball, and basketball. Other Olympic sports are also gaining popularity, such as boxing and weightlifting. Rugby league is the most popular sport in Papua New Guinea (especially in the highlands), which also unofficially holds the title as the national sport."PNG vow to upset World Cup odds". Rugby League. BBC. 2008-10-15. "But it would still be one of the biggest shocks in World Cup history if Papua New Guinea - the only country to have rugby league as its national sport - were to qualify for the last four."The annual Australian State of Origin series matches are the most watched sporting event of the year. The West New Britain rugby league player, Marcus Bai, is a national celebrity, after he played for the National Rugby League with Melbourne Storm (he also played in the Super League competition). A new national competition started in 2005 called the SP Cup. Australian rules football was once the most popular sport in PNG until the 1970s. It is gaining popularity with the introduction of players at the top level into the AFL, including Mal Michael (Brisbane Lions) and James Gwilt (St Kilda Football Club/Essendon Football Club). PNG has the largest number of Australian rules footballers outside of Australia, and has one of the fastest growing junior development programs. The "Mosquitos", currently captained by Navu Maha, are the national team and were runners up in the Australian Football International Cup, in both 2003 (to Ireland) and 2005 (to New Zealand). Cricket has been traditionally popular in Papua New Guinea, where the British had the most influence. In the Trobriand Islands, cricket has become fused with the local culture, and a game played with stones instead of a ball and unlimited fielders has developed. It was introduced in 1903, by Methodist missionaries, and has become a beloved sport there.

== Cultural sites ==
The country possesses one UNESCO World Heritage Site, the Kuk Early Agricultural Site, which was inscribed in 2008. The country, however, has no elements inscribed yet in the UNESCO Intangible Cultural Heritage Lists, despite having one of the widest arrays of intangible cultural heritage elements in the world.

== Media ==
Of national newspapers, there are two national English language daily newspapers, two English language weekly ones, and one weekly Tok Pisin newspaper. There are some local television services, as well as both government-run and private radio stations. There are 3 mobile carriers, although Digicel has a 92% market share due to its more extensive coverage of rural areas. Around two-thirds of the population is thought to have some mobile access, if intermittent.

== See also ==
- Eharo mask
- Wild man syndrome
- Papua New Guinean cuisine
- National Broadcasting Corporation of Papua New Guinea
- List of newspapers in Papua New Guinea
