= Tatanua mask =

Traditional mask in New Ireland, Papua New Guinea

Tatunua Mask
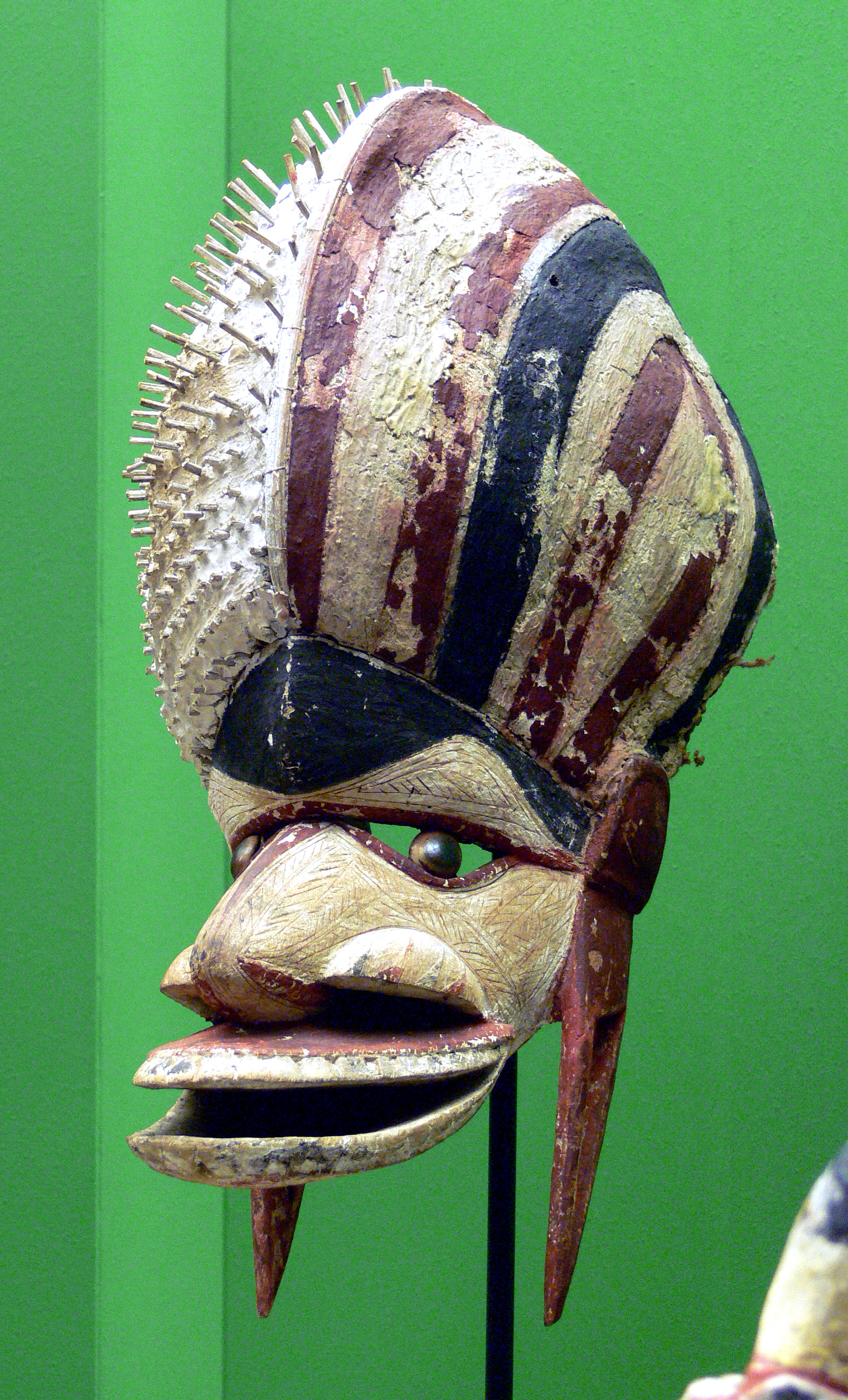
- Malanggan mask
- Material: Plant materials
- Present location: various including Derby Museum, England

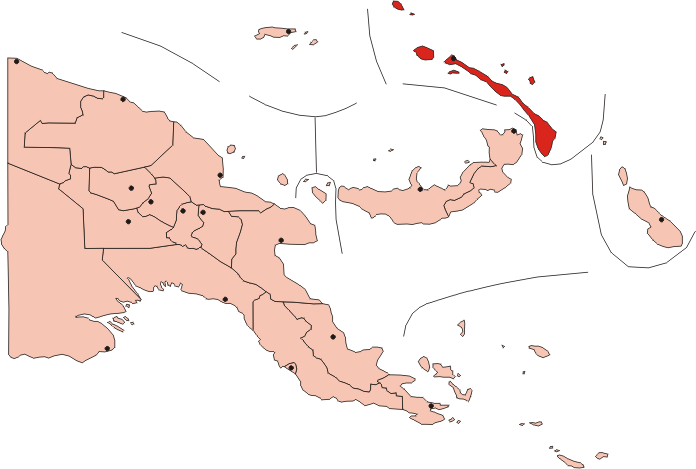
New Ireland Province, Papua New Guinea

A tatanua is a type of traditional mask made by the natives in the province of New Ireland, Papua New Guinea. The masks are made of wood and other natural materials and used in funeral ceremonies called malagan.

== Manufacture ==
Tatanua face masks are normally carved from lime wood and completed and decorated with fibres from sugar cane, wool and other animal hair. The face is coloured using chalk and other natural dyes. The type with a high headdress are created using a cane framework that was formerly then covered in bark, although later imported fabric was used as the covering. Besides the fabric, some masks also included imported optical brighteners, which made some nominally white areas slightly blue.

The masks are frequently identifiable by the pierced ear lobes and prominent mouth, which is normally carved as if the mouth is open. The masks can also be identified by the asymmetrical hair design: the mask is left bare of hair on one side to mimic how a New Ireland man would shave his head to show that he was in mourning.

== Ceremony ==
Tatanua masks are worn by ceremonial dancers and are often a part of New Ireland Malagan rituals. These are funerary religious ceremonies held by the family of the deceased to communicate with deities and to show respect for the deceased. Mannequins or statues representing the soul of the deceased are also shown at the malagan ceremonies. The local people construct them so that they celebrate the dead person's characteristics. They are elaborated with anthropomorphic symbols which are thought to represent the link between the people of New Ireland, their creation and the spiritual world to which they eventually pass on. The dances were performed in groups; only those who were respected would be allowed the honour of performing the dance, as it was important that observers see the community's strength.

The carved masks may take many months to construct, so that the person's death may not be formally marked for some time. The celebrations would be used as a time for the community to illustrate its skills to its neighbours as well as to meet, agree and perform the cultural aspect of a community member dying.

== Examples ==
Examples of this style of mask can be seen in the Ethnological Museum of Berlin, Derby Museum and Art Gallery, the British Museum and the Indianapolis Museum of Art.

== Gallery ==
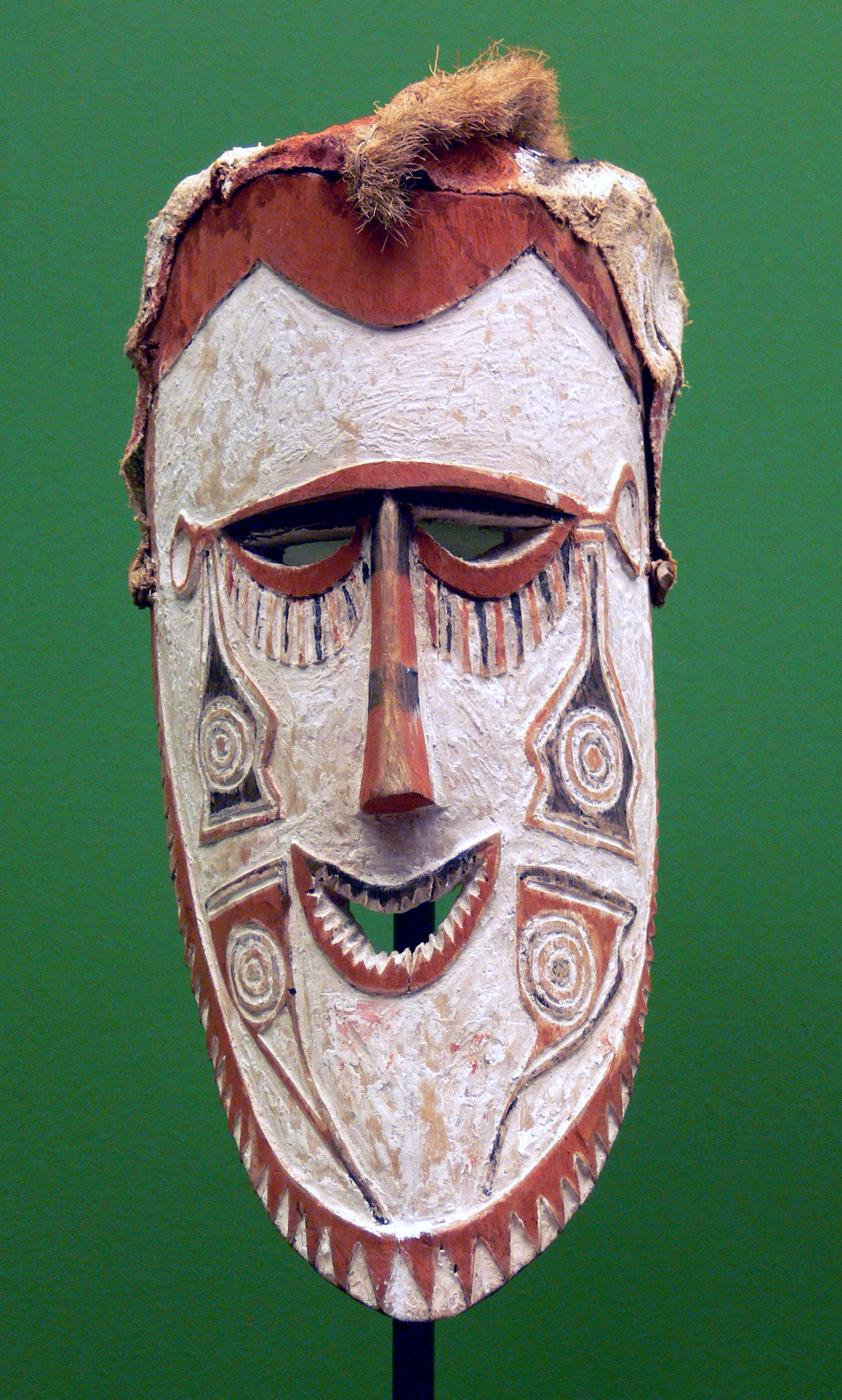
"Lorr" mask from Kait

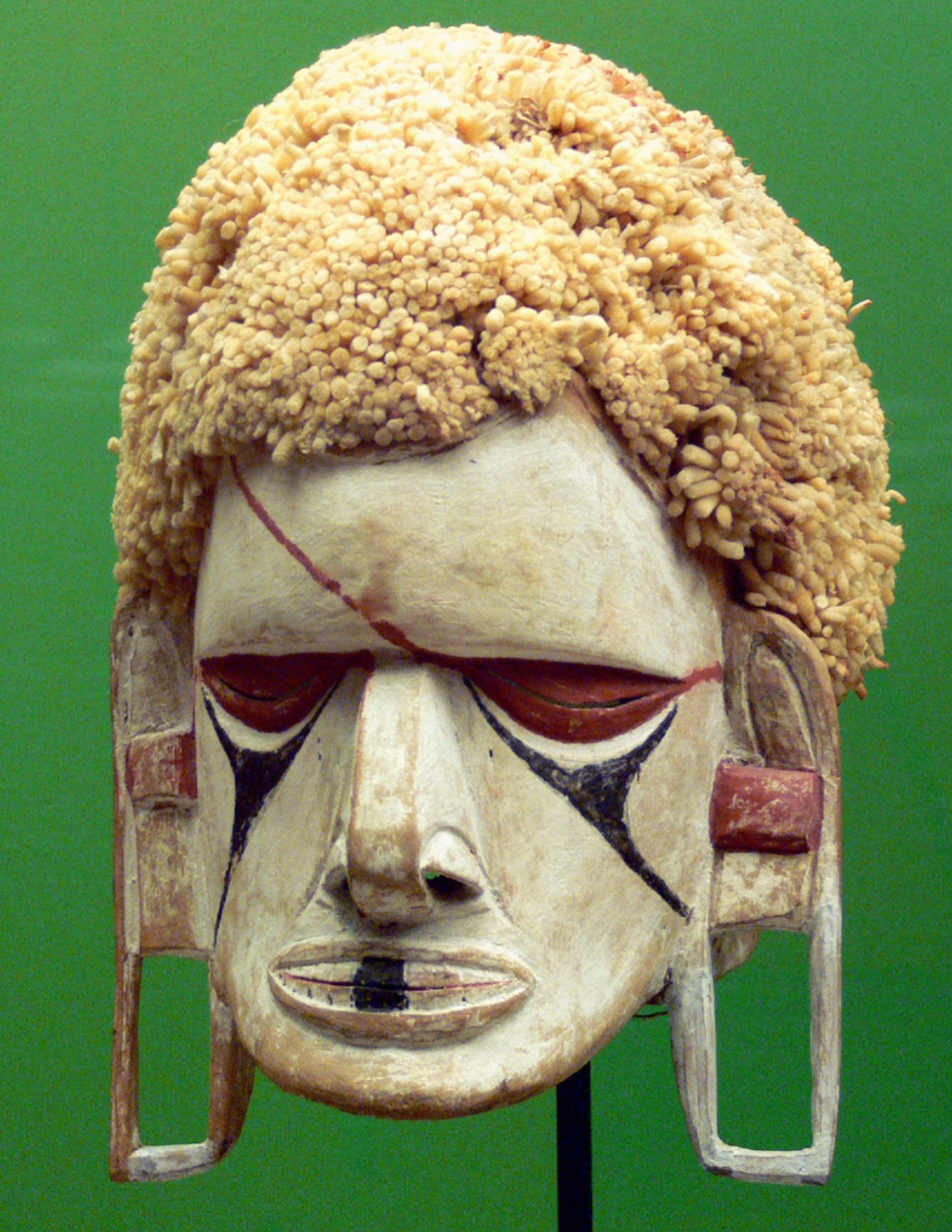
Malagan mask from Northern New Ireland

== See also ==
- Eharo mask
- Topeng
