= Traditional architecture of Papua New Guinea =

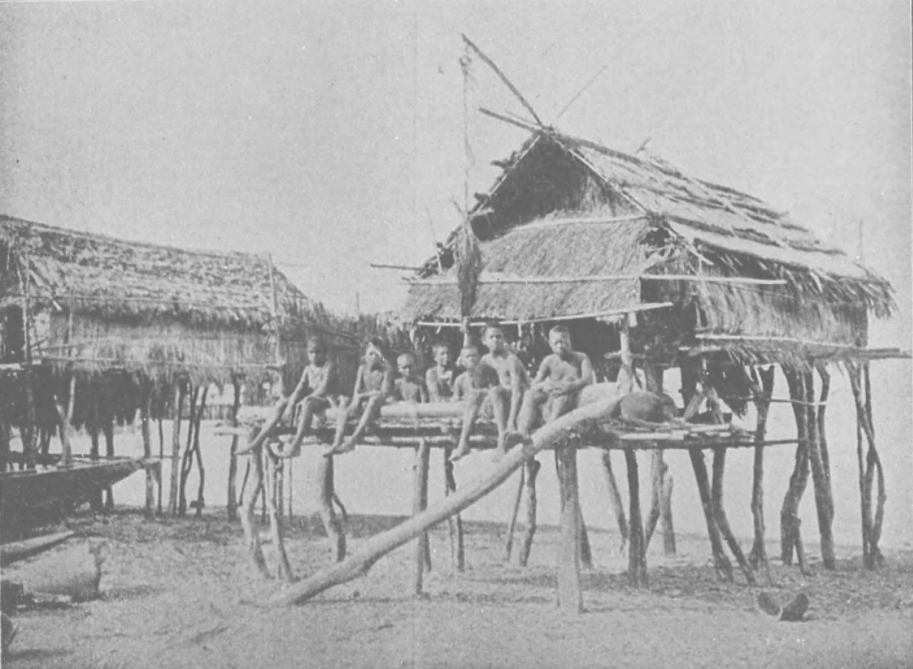
Traditional building in Papua

The traditional architecture of Papua New Guinea (PNG) reflects the diversity and ingenuity of this Pacific Island nation, with over 850 different ethnic groups each with its own distinct architectural styles, techniques, and materials. Their typical buildings range from houses on stilts to ceremonial and spiritual centers.

== Overview ==
The island's diverse geographic conditions, which include coastal areas, lowland rainforests, highland valleys, and swamplands, have significantly influenced the traditional architecture in each region. Buildings are typically constructed using locally sourced materials such as bamboo, wood, palm leaves, and sago palm. Each structure has a distinct purpose, whether for living, community gatherings, spiritual rituals, or warfare.

=== Housing ===
Traditional housing varies widely across the country. In coastal areas and swamps, the 'stilt house' or 'pile dwelling' is common. These are raised on wooden posts above the ground or water to protect against flooding, insects, and predators. The flooring is often made of split bamboo or sago palm, while the walls and roofs are typically thatched with palm leaves or grass.

In the highland regions, the round or oval-shaped houses, often known as 'Pit Houses', are partially or fully buried in the ground for insulation and protection against the elements. These houses often have a hearth at the center, used for cooking and warmth.

=== Ceremonial and Spiritual Architecture ===
Communal longhouses, also known as "Spirit Houses" or "Haus Tambarans," play a crucial role in the social and spiritual life of many Papua New Guinean communities, particularly in the Sepik River region. They are typically larger and more elaborately decorated than other buildings, showcasing intricate carvings and paintings depicting ancestral spirits and local mythologies. These structures are often the venue for initiation rites, meetings, and ceremonies.

In the highland regions, the ceremonial men's houses known as "Mendi" are used for similar purposes. These large, impressive structures are typically decorated with culturally significant symbols and motifs.

=== Construction Techniques ===
Traditional construction techniques in Papua New Guinea are designed to withstand the region's diverse and often challenging climatic conditions. Joinery techniques, such as mortise and tenon or lashing with vines, are used to create sturdy, flexible structures that can withstand earthquakes and heavy winds. Thatched roofs are angled steeply to shed rain quickly, and many houses are designed with high-pitched roofs and open sides to allow for air circulation, offering a practical solution to the tropical heat.

== See also ==
- Culture of Papua New Guinea
- Architecture of Oceania
- Vernacular Architecture
- Building materials processing in the vernacular architecture of Oceania
