= Building materials processing in the vernacular architecture of Oceania =

Materials used by Oceania's native architects

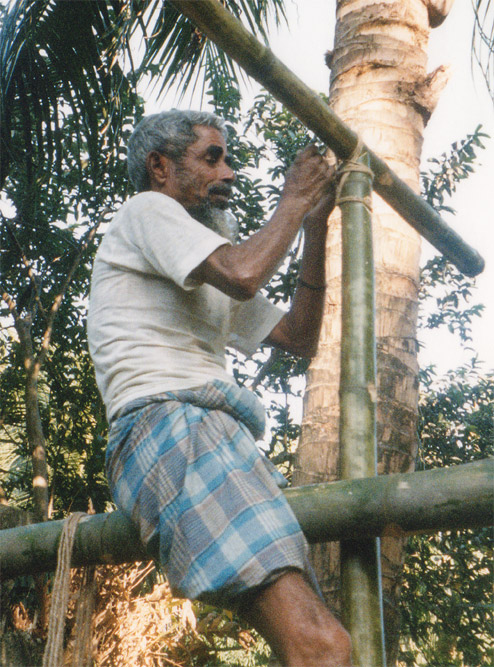
Bamboo Hut

The peoples of Oceania, spread across multiple island groups in the Pacific Ocean, developed unique architectural styles that made optimal use of the available resources. These included materials like timber, bamboo, pandanus, coconut palm, and coral.

== Materials and Their Processing ==
=== Timber ===
In the Pacific Islands, timber was and remains a crucial building material, with diverse species being utilized for different purposes. The preparation process involved felling, debarking, and often, curing for several months to ensure the material's durability. Specialized tools made from shell, stone, or later iron, were used to cut and shape the timber. This wood was primarily used in the construction of structural elements like posts, beams, and rafters.

=== Bamboo ===
Bamboo, particularly prevalent in Melanesia, was another crucial material used. The hollow, cylindrical structure of bamboo lends itself well to lightweight construction and ease of assembly. Bamboo canes were typically cut, dried, and then often treated with heat or submerged in water to prevent pest infestation.

=== Pandanus and coconut palm ===
Both pandanus and coconut palm were extensively used for thatching and wall materials in Oceanic architecture. These materials were harvested, dried, and often woven into mats or shingles. The leaves of the pandanus, when processed into a plaiting material, were used to create the panels in the walls and floors of houses, while the trunks could be used as posts.

=== Coral ===
In certain island groups like Kiribati, the absence of timber necessitated the use of other materials like coral. Coral blocks were extracted, dried, and used primarily for foundation and wall construction. Though less common, this practice demonstrates the resourcefulness of the indigenous Oceanic peoples in adapting to their environment.

== Building techniques ==
The processing of materials was intrinsically tied to the construction techniques employed. Lashed construction was dominant, with the processed timber, bamboo, and other materials being joined using plant fiber ropes rather than nails or screws. Notches were cut into posts and beams to facilitate lashing and provide structural integrity.

In the case of coral construction, a mortar made from ground coral and coconut water was commonly used to bind blocks together. The coral blocks were carefully chosen and shaped to fit tightly together, providing a robust and durable structure.

== See also ==
- Traditional Architecture of Papua New Guinea
- Hale (architecture)
