= Nalo =

Nalo is a surname and a given name. Notable people with the name include:

- Alfred Maseng Nalo, Vanuatuan politician
- Joe Nalo (born 1951), Papua New Guinean artist
- Nakap Nalo, Bharatiya Janata Party politician
- Nalo Hopkinson (born 1960), Canadian writer
