= Papua New Guinean cuisine =

National culinary traditions

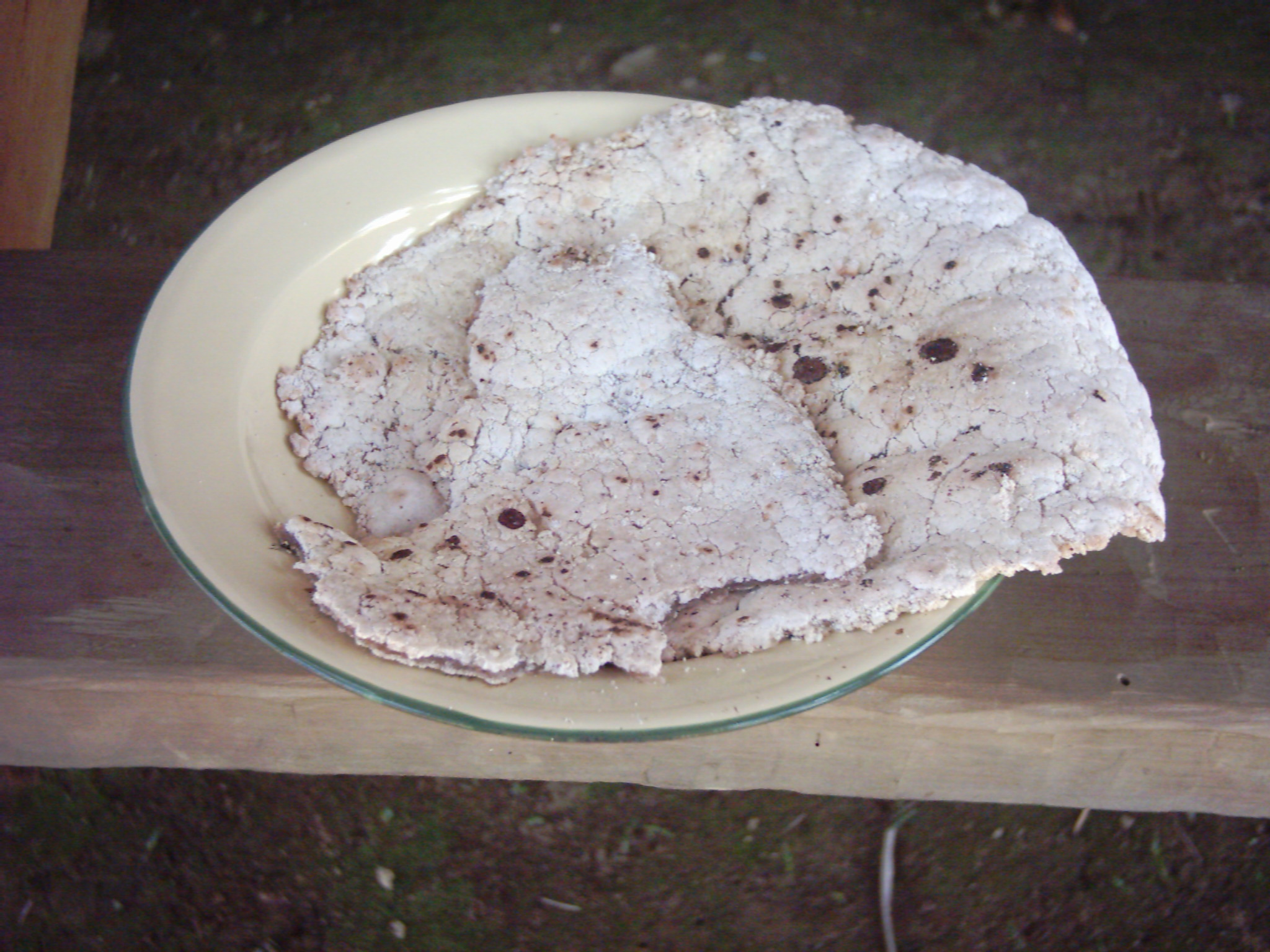
- Sago pancake
- Country or region: Papua New Guinea
- National dish: Mumu
- National drink: Beer, kulau (coconut)

The cuisine of Papua New Guinea comprises the traditional varied foods found in the eastern part of the New Guinea island. Approximately 80 percent of the population is reliant on subsistence agriculture, so a large percentage of food energy and protein consumed in Papua New Guinea is produced locally. The staple foods in Papua New Guinea include root crops, bananas, and sago. Papua New Guinea's diet is largely vegetarian, especially in the Gulf and Highlands regions.

Mumu is a traditional method of cooking large quantities of food throughout Papua New Guinea, as well as other islands in the Pacific. It consists of an earth oven that is filled with hot coal or stones, that may be placed in different orientations, and subsequently cooked for a lengthy period of time. Despite the presence of advent ovens in Papua New Guinea, mumu is still prevalent at the household level.

== Beverages ==
People often drink kulau, a green coconut filled with sweet, slightly tangy coconut water. Coffee is Papua New Guinea's second largest agricultural export, after oil palm, and is primarily grown in the Highlands Region. Hence, coffee is a widely consumed beverage in the country. Tea, introduced by the British, is very popular in the coastal areas, especially in the southern region. It is often drunk steaming hot, black and very sweet. Tea is grown locally in the Highlands Region. Apart from non-alcoholic drinks, beer is an alcoholic beverage that is favoured among many Papua New Guineans.

== Staples ==
Sago is a common and essential part of Papua New Guinean cuisine, as the starch ingredient is included in several traditional dishes, such as pancakes and pudding. Sago is in the form of flour usually extracted from the palm tree. Staples of the Papua New Guinean diet include karuka, sweet potato (kaukau), cassava, breadfruit (ulu), and coconuts. Coconut cream is often found in local dishes. Coastal regions traditionally use coconut milk and cream as a cooking medium, while the Highlands regions do not. Coconut oil is used on special occasions in the coastal regions.

Meat proteins are occasionally consumed in Papua New Guinea. However, for people residing in coastal areas, seafood forms a substantial part of their diet. Pork is regarded as a celebratory meat in Papua New Guinea, and is prepared on special occasions, including Christmas feasts.

== Notable dishes ==
- Mumu is regarded as the national dish of Papua New Guinea. It is composed of pork or chicken, sweet potato, taro, plantains, with leafy vegetables. Mumu is an example of a balanced dish composed of the two bases, crops (including starch) and meat. The dish is named after the earth oven used traditionally. Food is wrapped in a parcel of banana leaves and, in modern times, aluminium foil. The composition of the mumu differs slightly between regions with a type of fern being the preferred green in the highlands region; the NGI region uses coconut cream extensively.

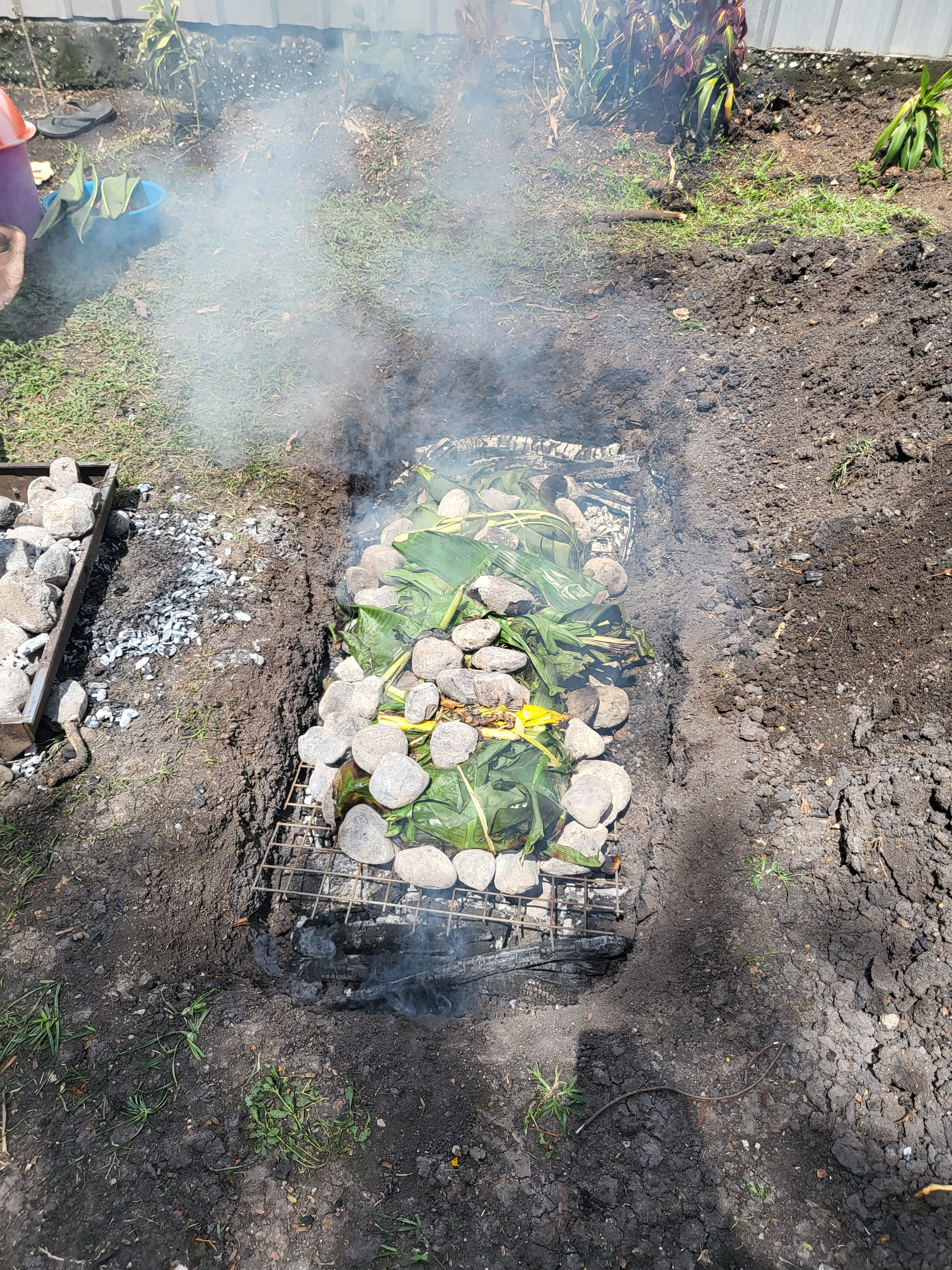
Preparing a mumu

- Chicken pot is a dish consisting of chicken that has been stewed with mixed vegetables and coconut cream.
- Aigir is similar to mumu and is made by placing hot rocks into a pot of coconut milk to which protein, usually chicken, is added with plantains and sweet potatoes and lots of leafy greens and ginger. The dish is cooked in as little as 30 minutes owing to the hot rocks.
- Kokoda is a dish consisting of fish that is cooked in a lime-coconut sauce. The dish is similar to ceviche. Kokoda is also present in Fijian cuisine.
- Saksak is the local name for sago flour, a local staple. In the Sepik region it is mixed with boiling hot water to make nangu, a gelatinous dumpling that is eaten as the basic starch in many meals. Saksak is also pressed onto a hot pan, sometimes mixed with grated coconut, to make a tortilla-like pancake.
- Dia is a dessert composed of a sago and banana dumpling steamed in a banana-leaf wrapping. It is then served with clotted coconut cream. Sweet ripe bananas are used to lend sweetness to the dish. This dish is also known as pariwa.
- Lamb flaps are lamb trimmings that are often cooked on roadside grill stands. The lamb is marinated with ginger, garlic and chicken bouillon powder. It is often accompanied with a salad made with cress, sliced raw ginger and onion, and plantains or sweet potato cooked on the grill plate.

== Culinary influences ==
The arrival of Europeans to Papua New Guinea, beginning in the 16th century, was the first foreign introduction to the local cuisine. European settlers imported livestock and crops to the region in the 19th century, which served significant commercial value. The cuisine and traditions of Papua New Guinea have assimilation with Indonesian Papua and other Pacific nations. The dish kokoda—composed of fish cooked in a sauce of lime and coconut—is also present in Fijian cuisine.

== Fast food ==
Few fast food chains operate in Papua New Guinea, excepting Hog's Breath Cafe (an Australian steakhouse chain), Big Rooster (a locally owned chicken shop chain) and Eagle Boys (an Australian pizzeria chain). There are no large American fast food chains in Papua New Guinea.

== See also ==
- Culture of Papua New Guinea
- Oceanic cuisine
