= Sanguma =

Papua New Guinean musical ensemble

Sanguma was a Papua New Guinean musical ensemble active from 1977 to 1985. They combined music from the cultural traditions of Papua New Guinea with Western instruments and were one of the first Papua New Guinean music groups to perform internationally. Sanguma was formed at the Papua New Guinea National Arts School in 1977 through a training program called the creative workshop that valued learning in the real situation and the natural oral tradition ability of Papua New Guineans. Students were encouraged to share traditional music and culture from their local communities and create a contemporary arrangement of it. This was the initiative of Sandra Krempl-Pereira, who in 1977, was the Coordinator of the Music Department. It was Sandra Krempl-Pereira who directed the first Sanguma concert in November 1977 supported by Les McLaren, a fellow music teacher who also started in 1977. There were other contributing music teachers at the school at the time. Jeanette Richmond new in 1977, and continuing music teachers included Keith Stebbins (immediate past coordinator) and Dave Hall – all adding to a wealth of diverse music styles and knowledge for Sanguma to draw from. In 1978 Sanguma performed in schools around the country and began representing PNG at overseas cultural events. Sanguma was nurtured very closely from late 1979 by the Australian musician Ric Halstead.

Sanguma produced six albums in cassette format; the two eponymously titled Sanguma 1 and Sanguma 2 in the late 1970s also Sanguma Live vol 1 and 2 and ‘Eberia’ with the National Dance Company and in 1983, 'Sanguma Suites', an adventurous excursion into progressive/traditional/rock/jazz/fusion composed by band members Tony Subam (East Sepik Province) and Sebastian Miyoni (Milne Bay Province) and ostensibly by these two musicians rather than the band Sanguma, but as the band featured heavily on the album it was in all but name a Sanguma album. The first two albums were somewhat better received than was Sanguma Suites as they were closer to the traditional music of Papua New Guinea. All the albums utilised modern amplified instrumentation to supplement the traditional flutes, drums and vocal sequences. In 1979 Sanguma toured PNG performing in Lae, Goroka, Madang, Wewak, Manus and Alotau. In 1980 they performed at the opening of the P.N.G High Commission in Canberra, Australia as well as performing in Kings Cross in Sydney and the Bondi Hotel. Sanguma also performed in Düsseldorf in Germany and whilst on route took time out to climb the Eiffel Tower in Paris. Sanguma also performed in Japan, These ventures were under the guidance of Ric Halstead who was their mentor from 1979 to 1982. Sanguma supported UK reggae band Steel Pulse on a tour of the US West Coast in 1983, receiving favourable reviews and attracting interest in Papua New Guinea's traditions and indirectly promoting the nascent tourist industry.

Hearing the Future: The Music and Magic of the Sanguma Band, by Denis Crowdy, was published in January 2016 by University of Hawai'i Press in their series on Music and Performing Arts of Asia and the Pacific. The book describes the band as "united under one goal: to create a sound that represented the birth of a new, sovereign, and distinctly Melanesian nation; and to express their values, identities, and cosmology through their music and performance."

In Hearing the Future, Australian ethnomusicologist Denis Crowdy documents and analyzes the music and activities of the Sanguma band, arguing that their music was a vital form of cultural expression in sync with sociopolitical change then taking place in PNG. Drawing from rock, jazz, and nascent "world music" influences, Sanguma reached audiences far from their home nation, introducing the world to modern music, Melanesia-style, with its fusion of old and new, local and global. Performances ranged from ensembles of Melanesian log drums (garamuts) to extended songs and improvisations involving electric guitars, synthesizers, saxophone, trumpet, bamboo percussion, panpipes, and kuakumba flutes. The band sang in a variety of local vernacular languages, as well as in Tok Pisin and English. To further emphasize their ancestral style, the musicians wore decorative headdresses and body decoration from all around the nation, along with distinctive pants featuring indigenous designs."

== Members ==
Core	Responsibilities
Raymond Hakena	bamboo flute, percussion, drums, voice
Thomas Komboi	composition and arrangement, keyboard, trumpet, percussion
Sebastian Miyoni	composition and arrangement, keyboard, percussion, voice, wind
Tony Subam	composition and arrangement, flute, keyboard, percussion, voice, wind, saxophone.
Leonard Taligatus	guitar, percussion, voice, wind
Buruka Tau	composition and arrangement, keyboard
Paul Yabo	percussion, trumpet, voice
Apa Saun	bass guitar bamboo flutes, percussion, voice
Aaron Murray	composition and arrangement, flute, keyboard, percussion, voice and dance.
Guest performers
Ben Hakalits	drums, percussion
Yawn Yambon	Trombone
Jesse James Pongap	flute
