= Hale (architecture) =

Hale is a traditional form of Hawaiian architecture, known for its distinctive style, practicality, and close relationship with the natural environment. These indigenous structures were designed to be highly functional, meeting a menagerie of needs in Hawaiian society.

The term "hale" in the Hawaiian language translates to "house" or "home," and it encompasses a variety of structures with different purposes, such as living, cooking, canoe storage, and religious or ceremonial activities. The construction, use, and spiritual significance of hale were deeply intertwined with ancient Hawaiian culture, and their designs evolved over hundreds of years to adapt to the specific conditions of the Hawaiian Islands.

== Etymology ==
"Hale" is a cognate of the Samoan word fale and the Māori word whare (pronounced /ˈfɑːɹeɪ/).

== History ==
The ancient Hawaiians were meticulous and practical builders. They constructed their hale using materials available in the immediate environment, mainly consisting of wood, leaves, and grass. They employed a form of building known as post-and-beam construction, where vertical posts support horizontal beams. The Hawaiians did not use metal nails or screws but relied on cordage made from coconut fiber to bind the structures together.

== Design and functionality ==
The design of a hale generally consisted of a thatched roof, elevated floors, and open walls, allowing for maximum air circulation to cope with the warm, tropical climate. The thatched roof, usually made of pili grass or sugarcane leaves, provided protection from rain. The elevation of the floor, supported by wooden stilts, helped prevent damage from flooding while discouraging pests.

There were several different types of hale, each serving a specific purpose. For example, the 'Hale Aliʻi' was the house of a chief, the 'Hale Noho' served as a dwelling for commoners, the 'Hale Mua' was the men's eating house, and the 'Hale Pahu' housed the sacred drums used in religious ceremonies.

== Significance in traditional culture ==
The construction of hale was not just a practical matter, but a deeply spiritual one. It was often overseen by a kahuna (a priest or master craftsman), who would conduct ceremonies and rituals to ensure the proper construction and sanctification of the structure. These rituals reflected the Hawaiian concept of mana, or spiritual energy, that was believed to imbue all things.

The locations of the hale were carefully chosen according to the Hawaiian system of land division known as the ahupua'a, which spanned from the mountains to the sea. This ensured that each community had access to the various resources they needed.
