= Eharo mask =

Type of dance mask used by the Elema people of the eastern Gulf of Papua

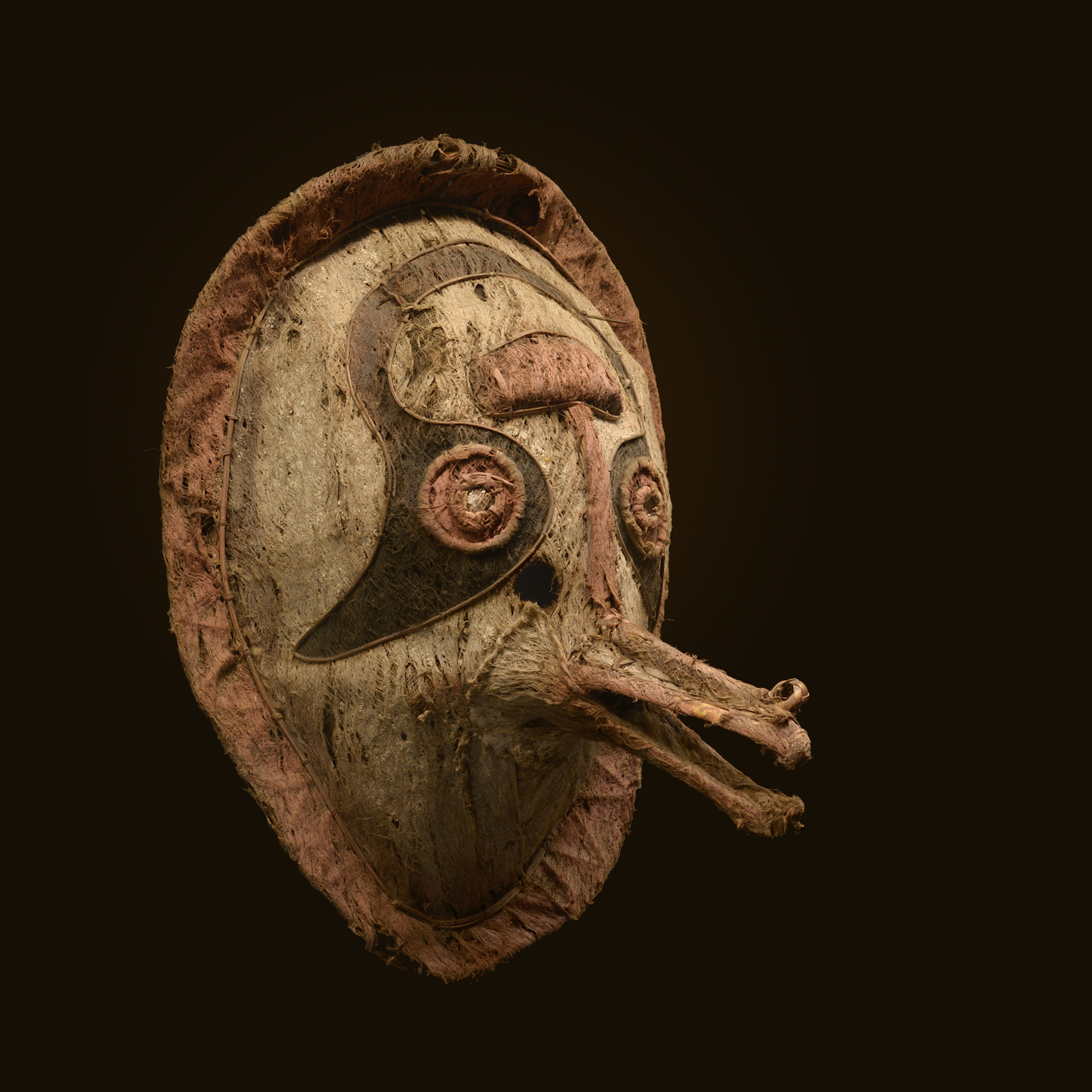
Eharo mask, Elema culture, Papua New Guinea, acquired by the Museum of Toulouse in 1882

Eharo masks (literally "dance head" or "dance mask") were a type of mask used by the Elema people of the eastern Gulf of Papua as part of the "hevehe" cycle of masked rituals. These masks were crafted from barkcloth, vegetable fiber, and various pigments.

In contrast to the large sacred hevehe masks, the smaller eharo masks were meant for amusing the audience, and were used only twice during the 7 to 20 years long hevehe cycle (beginning and end). The cycle is not practiced anymore today. Some represented specific spirits, while others were simply humorous archetypes from stories. Because they are not as sacred compared to other masks, the women of the village were allowed to observe the mask's construction. These masks would later be burned about a month after the ceremonies, making it difficult to recover samples.

It was during the time period of these practices that Vailala Madness took place. In an effort many rituals were destroyed and replaced with more European-accepted ones. Although this suppression took place, the Papuan Gulf people continued to practice these cycles and display their heritage.

In modern-day these masks cycle through museums, along with photo galleries such as Hevebe: arts of the Papuan Gulf. This exhibition was where audience members were introduced to the vibrant and active nature of these masks to add a new dimension aside from the immobile items seen in collections.

== See also ==
- Culture of Papua New Guinea
- Malagan
