= Malagan =

Cultural events in New Ireland, Papua New Guinea

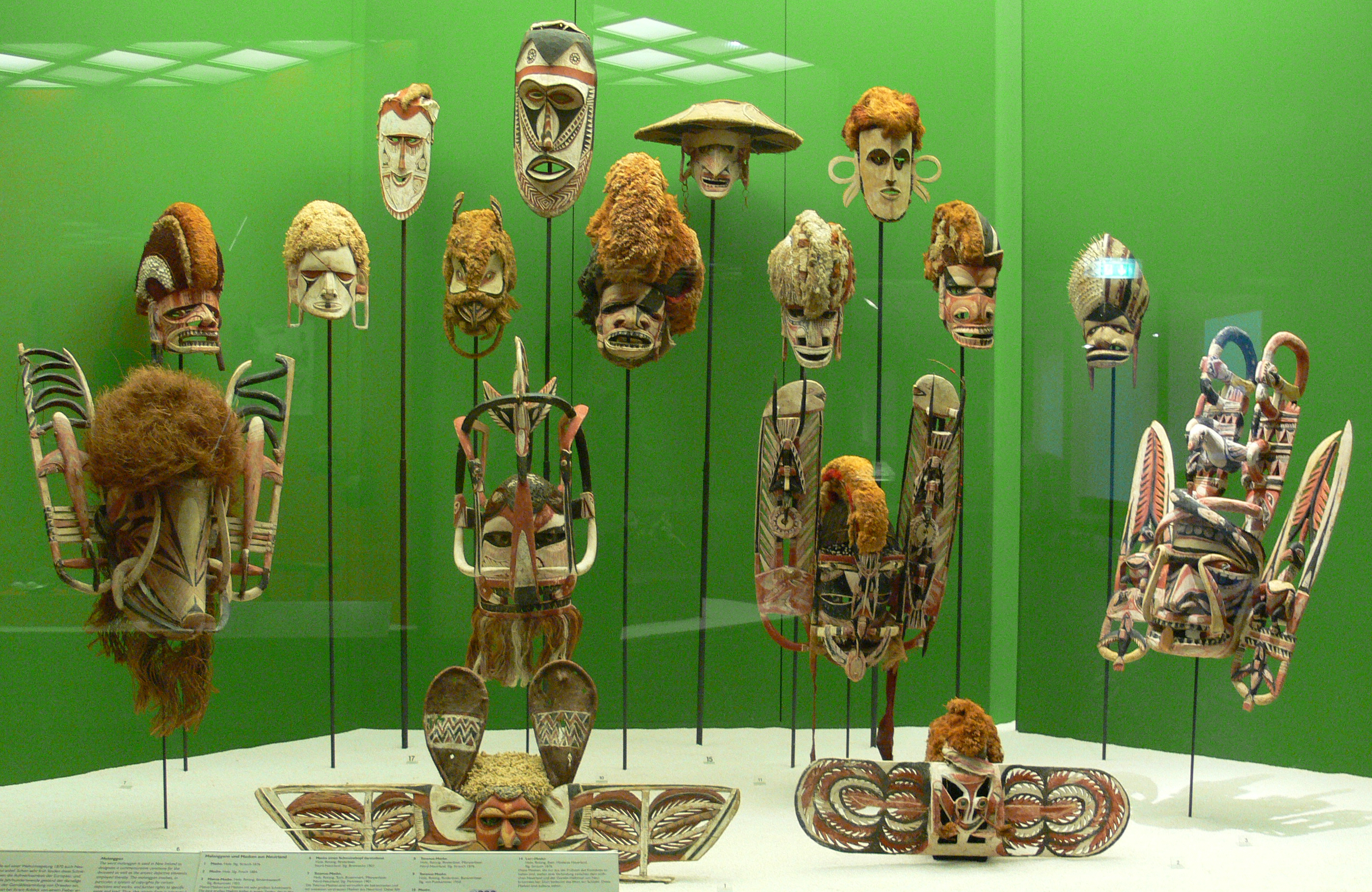
Malagan masks from the Ethnological Museum of Berlin

Malagan (also spelled malangan or malanggan) ceremonies are large, intricate traditional cultural events that take place in parts of New Ireland province in Papua New Guinea. The word malagan refers to wooden carvings prepared for ceremonies and to an entire system of traditional culture.

== Malagan ceremonies ==
Malagan ceremonies are the most large-scale and famous of the many events that take place within the malagan culture. They take place irregularly, and are typically large and complex events, taking several days, and requiring months or years of preparation.

While a malagan ceremony is always held in the name of one or more people who have died in recent years, it is not at all merely a mortuary rite. Many other interactions take place within the overall event, including announcements, repayment of debts, recognition of obligations, resolution of disputes, and many other customary activities.

== Malagan carvings and carvers ==
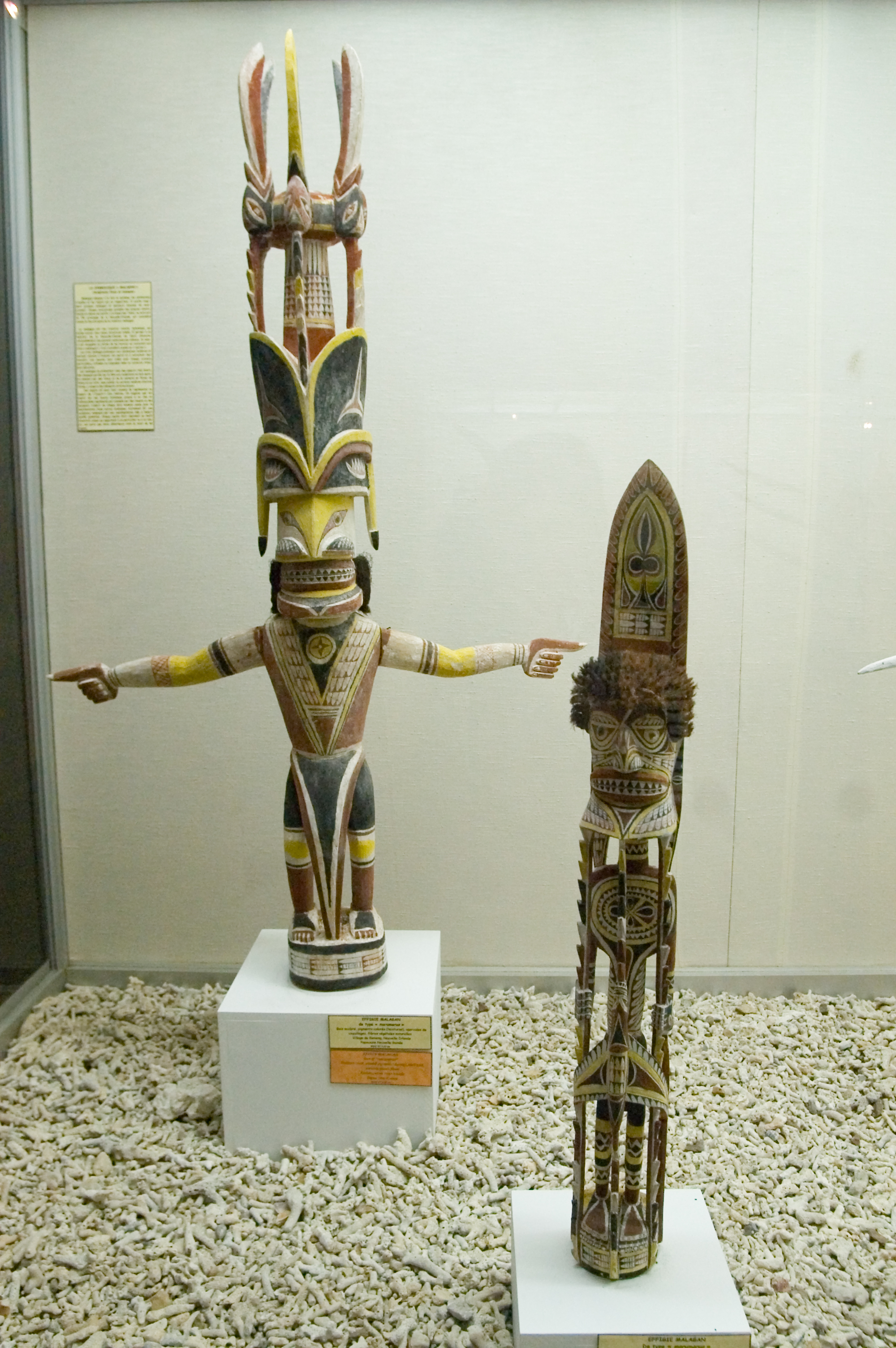
Malagan carvings

Malagan carvings, now world-famous, are the wooden carvings which are created for use in malagan ceremonies. Traditionally these were burnt or placed in a cave to rot at the conclusion of the event; in modern times most are now retained, as the carving tradition is now only known by a few. Contemporary masters of malagan form include Michael Homerang of Madina Village, Ben Sisia of Libba Village (northern New Ireland) and Edward and Mathew Salle of Lava Village (Tatau, Tabar Islands, New Ireland). Many malagan carvings are held in European and other museums.

== Malagan culture ==
Malagan culture is the general term for the traditional culture in the area where malagan ceremonies take place, covering much of Northern New Ireland province. There are many other ceremonies and customary practices within this large and complex cultural system.

The word malagan comes from the Nalik language of northern New Ireland. Alternative spellings include malangan and malanggan.

== See also ==
- Eharo mask
- List of folk festivals
