= Garamut =

Musical instrument from Papua New Guinea

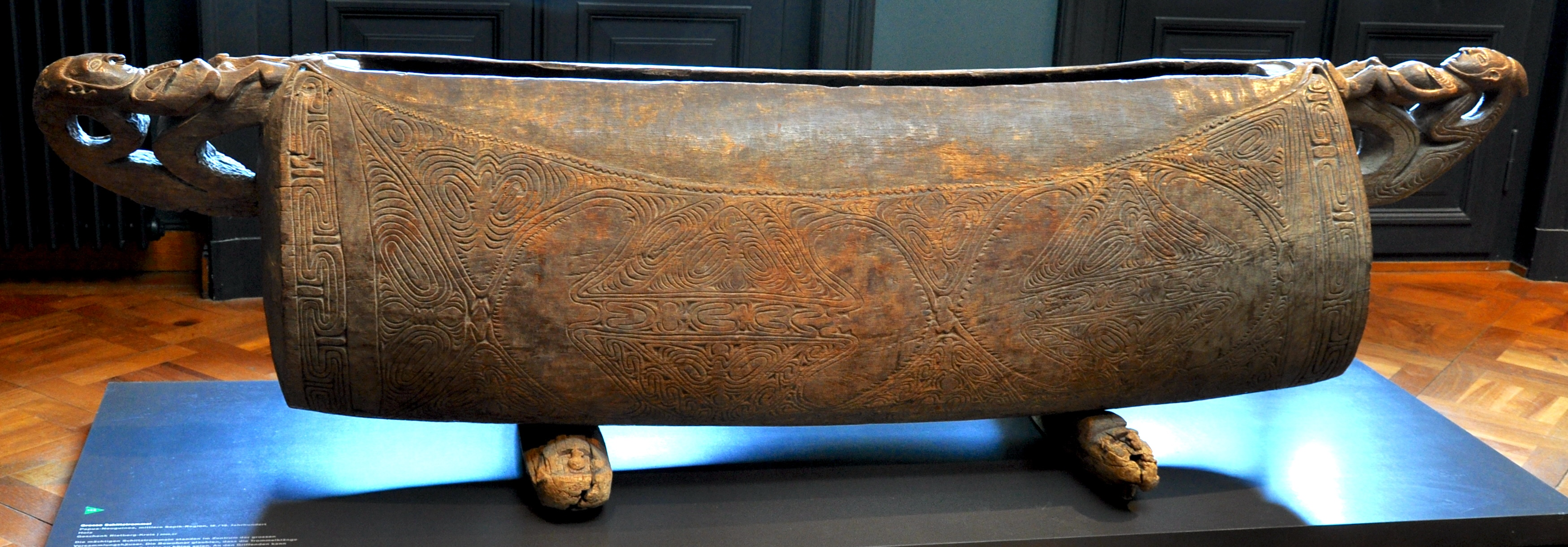
A garamut from the Sepik region

The garamut is a kind of slit drum made in Papua New Guinea. Carved from a single log, a garamut is beaten with sticks to produce sound from its central cavity. Garamuts have historically played an important cultural role in many Papua New Guinea communities, serving as a means of communication as well as a musical instrument. "Garamut" is a Tok Pisin word meaning "song" and "to silence". This name has become commonly understood throughout the country, although the instrument may have different names in other languages.

Garamuts may have come to New Guinea with the Austronesian peoples. Each takes multiple days to complete, and they are sometimes decorated with intricate and symbolic designs. The rhythms used can convey particular messages for many kilometres. Individuals and clans may have their own identifying patterns.

In some communities garamuts continue to hold cultural value. Their use is often gendered, restricted to men and part of male initiation rituals. An individual garamut often belongs to one individual or family, and some are played only for important events, such as births and deaths. They can be played by one or two people. When used for music, they are prominent in events such as sing-sings.

== Name ==
Garamut is a Tok Pisin word that may also be used to refer to the Vitex cofassus tree. It derives from the Tolai language, where gara means singing or calling out, and i mut means to be quiet and listen. This has also been translated as "song" and "to silence". The name has become used throughout the country. In the Kaian language, garamut are referred to as rumbung, which has a similar meaning of listening in silence. In the Boiken language they are called mie, which also means "tree". In English, the plural garamuts is often used.

== Design and construction ==
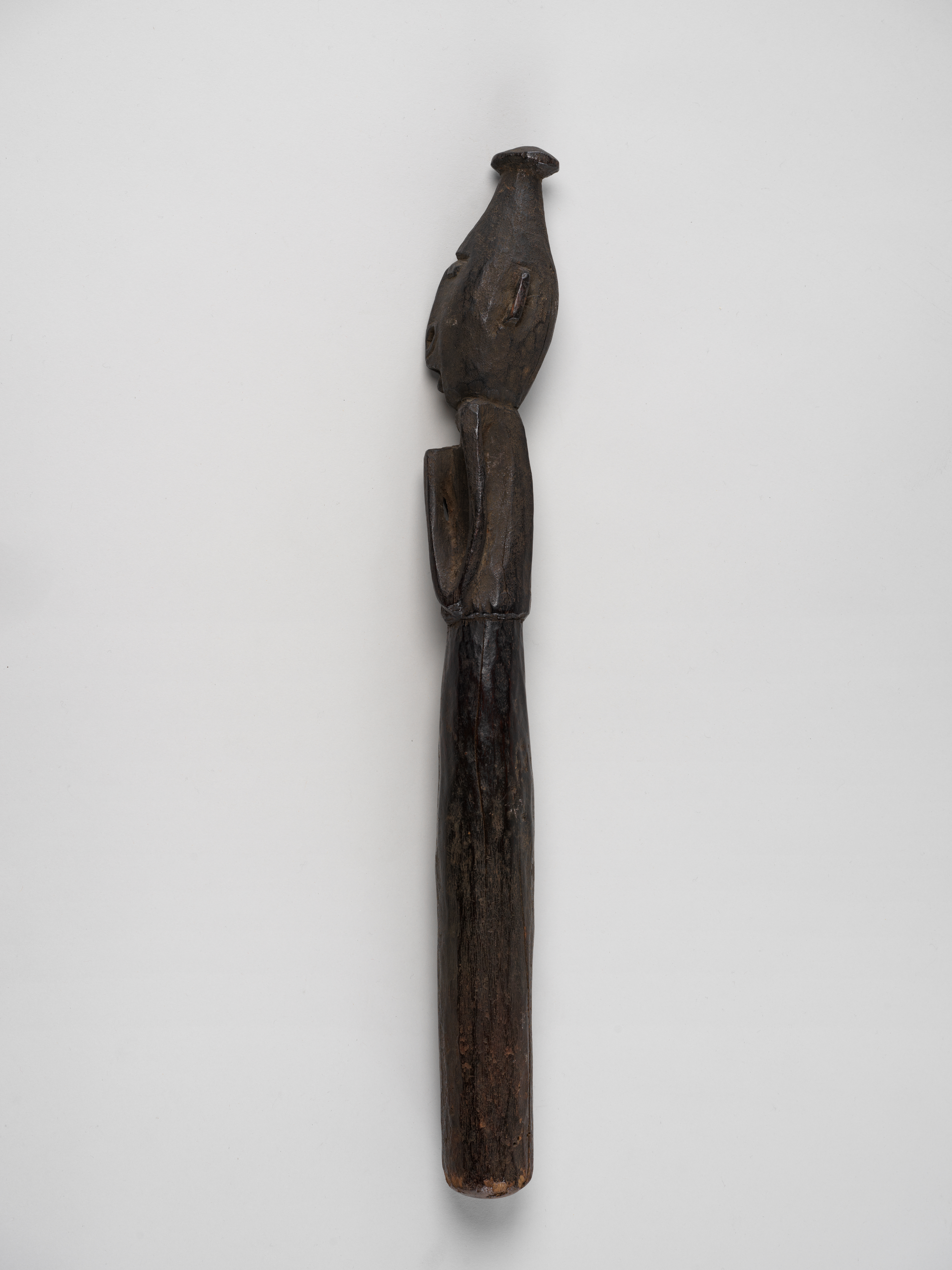
A beater stick from the Sepik region

Garamuts are a type of slit drum. Each is made from a single tree trunk, hollowed out through carving or burning. The resulting shape can be round, oval, or triangular, with a handle at each end. The kind of tree used can accord certain meanings. Some are made in pairs, with a larger selek and a smaller heik. This results in the larger having a deeper sound with a lower pitch and the smaller having a sharper sound at a higher pitch.

Garamuts can be placed on the ground or suspended in the air. Sounds are made by striking beater sticks near the slit which leads to a large central cavity. This form of making music classifies the garamut a type of idiophone. They are also referred to as slit gongs. A garamut can be played by one or two people.

Specific designs vary from being plain to intricate designs, often varying by locality. Markings on the logs often represent particular clans or sub-clans. The creation process from cutting down a tree to the finished product can take two to three days. Creation sometimes includes magic rites and other traditional practices. The beating sticks are carved from the same tree as the garamut itself. The completion of a garamut is often celebrated with music and food. The correct execution of particular rituals is seen as key to the garamut producing a good sound.

== Use and meaning ==
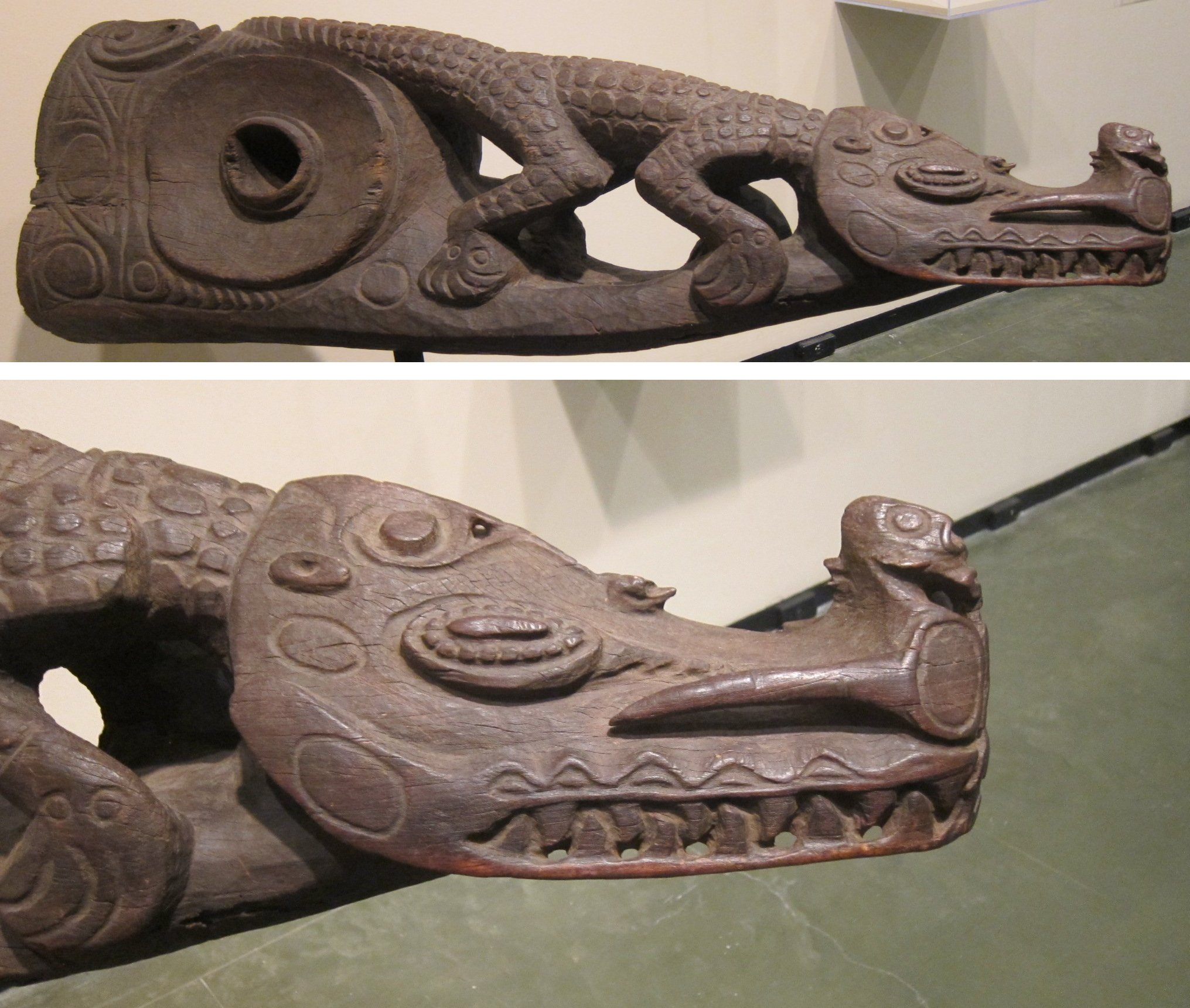
The handle of a garamut from the Sepik region

Garamut are found throughout Papua New Guinea, particularly in coastal and island areas. Playing styles differ, with the instruments sometimes being used individually and sometimes being used within a wider ensemble. The sound can be heard for multiple kilometres, and so they are traditionally used for communication as well as for music.

The concept of the slit drum likely came to Papua New Guinea with the Austronesian migration. Historically, garamuts played important cultural roles, and may have served as homes for spirits. The sound of a garamut is considered its 'voice', which can represent spirits or ancestors. A damaged garamut can be said to have 'died'.

A single garamut can become closely linked to an individual or to a family or kinship group. Some are passed from fathers to sons, and have a strong association with gender due to being carved outside the view of women and girls. In the Sepik area they are involved in male ritual initiations. In some cultures obtaining a signature drum beat that identifies you as an individual is part of this male initiation, symbolising a measure of respect. Obtaining a personal garamut, often after a wedding, is another symbolic moment. This male exclusivity is not universal. Among the Kaian people, individual instruments are named by female elders. Garamut can be carved with female motifs as well as male ones, with the logs sometimes representing human bodies. When garamuts are produced in pairs, sometimes the smaller one is played by women.

Among the Tolai people, special garamut are reserved for ceremonial roles, such as announcing the death of an important community member. In one Tolai origin story for the instrument, it was created by To Karvuvu, whose brother To Kabinana told him "the deaths of our children will be drummed out on it when they die". Other events which may be commemorated in different communities include births, new houses, and launching a canoe.

In modern times, they have in many cases lost this association, being viewed as merely musical instruments, although especially among older generations they retain an association with spiritual power. Their use and handling is still sometimes governed by a series of rules, including situations such as when someone is sick when they should not be played, For musical purposes, they are often played at sing-sings, sometimes being used to announce the sing-sing will take place. In some parts of Madang Province garamuts were used for daily communication until at least the 2000s, with different rhythms indicating different messages. They provide a way for coastal communities to communicate with upland ones up to 10 kilometres (6.2 mi) away, and are compared by locals to the concept of phones. Other areas saw use decrease as early as the 1970s. Individual garamuts have unique and recognisable sounds, and so the use of a particular garamut can indicate the intended recipient. Individuals or clans may also be identified through specific rhythms.

== See also ==
- Kundu (drum)
