= Joe Nalo =

Papua New Guinean artist (born 1951)

Joe Nalo (born 1951) is an artist from Papua New Guinea. Nalo is a painter, printmaker, art teacher and curator. He was the first curator for contemporary art at the National Museum and Art Gallery of Papua New Guinea. Nalo has been described in the journal Pacific Arts as "one of the best contemporary artists" in Papua New Guinea.

== Biography ==
Nalo was born in on Johnson Island in the Admiralty Islands in Manus Province, Papua, New Guinea. Whilst at school, Nalo won the Carriapa Art Shield. After graduating from teachers college he taught expressive arts and other subjects at Wau International Primary School. From 1970 to 1972 he was headmaster of Salamaua Boarding School and during this period continued to study art privately with artist Lucy Walker. Nalo had already received several painting commissions when he was offered a scholarship in 1974 to study the Creative Arts Centre in Port Moresby and later went on to teach at the National Arts School as well as a professional artist. In 1975, Nalo represented Papua New Guinea at the 10th World Crafts Conference in Montreal, Canada. He travelled with Jakupa to Stuttgart, Germany in 1979 where their art was featured in an exhibition of contemporary Papua New Guinean art held in association with the 9th occasions since 1976. Nalo became a full time artist in 1991. He did his Primary Education at Kalalo Community School 1975, and then attended Siassi High School 1979. His talent was noticed by the Expressive Arts teacher and was encouraged to pursue studies in the arts.

In 2007, Nalo was cited as an authority on the symbolism of traditional New Guinea carvings in a book published by the Metropolitan Museum of Art in New York.

In 2008, his work was included as part of an exhibit called "Altogether: Contemporary Papua New Guinea Art" at the East–West Center in Honolulu.

In 2009, Nalo was one of the artists whose work was shown at the first comprehensive exhibition of Melanesian art in Auckland, New Zealand.
