= Arts by region =

Arts by region

== Africa ==
Art

African art reflects the diversity of African cultures. The oldest existing art from Africa are 6,000-year-old carvings found in Niger, while the Great Pyramid of Giza in Egypt was the world's tallest architectural accomplishment for 4,000 years until the creation of the Eiffel Tower. The Ethiopian complex of monolithic churches at Lalibela, of which the Church of Saint George is representative, is regarded as another marvel of engineering.

Dance

The term African dance refers mainly to the dances of subsaharan Africa. The music and dances of northern Africa and the Sahara are generally more closely connected to those of the Near East. Also the dances of immigrants of European and Asian descent (e.g. in South Africa) are not covered by this article.

African dance has to be viewed in close connection with African Music.

A central trait of African dance is that it is polycentric. This means that - unlike many other regions of the world - the body is not treated as a "stiff" unit but is segmented into several centers of movement (shoulders, chest, pelvis, arms, legs etc.) that may be moved according to different rhythmical components of the music or even add rhythmical components of their own. This may result in very complex movements "inside" the body, as opposed to the movement through space of the whole body that plays the most important role in many European choreographies.

Music

The music of Africa is one of its most dynamic art forms. Egypt has long been a cultural focus of the Arab world, while remembrance of the rhythms of sub-Saharan Africa, in particular west Africa, was transmitted through the Atlantic slave trade to modern samba, blues, jazz, reggae, rap, and rock and roll. Modern music of the continent includes the highly complex choral singing of southern Africa and the dance rhythms of soukous, dominated by the music of the Democratic Republic of Congo. A recent development of the twenty first century is the emergence of African hip hop. In particular, a form from Senegal is blended with traditional mbalax. Recently in South Africa, a form of music related to house music known under the name Kwaito has developed, although the country has been home to its own form of South African jazz for some time, while Afrikaans music is completely distinct and composed mostly of traditional Boere musiek, and forms of folk and rock music.

== Anglo America (United States and Canada) ==
=== Canada ===
Canadian culture has historically been heavily influenced by English, French, Irish, Scottish and Aboriginal cultures and traditions, and over time has been greatly influenced by American culture due to its proximity and the interchange of human capital. Many forms of American media and entertainment are popular, if not dominant in Canada; conversely, many Canadian cultural products and entertainers are successful in the US and worldwide. Many cultural products are now marketed toward a unified "North American" market, or a global market generally.

The creation and preservation of more distinctly Canadian culture has been partly influenced by federal government programs, laws and institutions such as the Canadian Broadcasting Corporation (CBC), the National Film Board of Canada (NFB), and the Canadian Radio-television and Telecommunications Commission (CRTC).

=== United States ===
Music in the United States also traces to the country's melting-pot population through a diverse array of styles. Rock and roll, hip hop, country, blues, and jazz are among the country's most internationally renowned genres. Since the late 19th century, popular recorded music from the United States has become increasingly known across the world, such that some forms of American popular music are heard almost everywhere.

However, not all American culture is derived from some other form found elsewhere in the world. For example, the birth of cinema, as well as its radical development, can largely be traced back to the United States. In 1878, the first recorded instance of sequential photographs capturing and reproducing motion was Eadweard Muybridge's series of a running horse, which the British-born photographer produced in Palo Alto, California, using a row of still cameras. Since then, the American film industry, centered in Hollywood, California, has had a profound effect on cinema across the world. Other areas of development include the comic book and Disney's animated films, which saw widespread popularity and influence, especially in Japanese anime and manga and Chinese animation and manhua.

== Asia ==
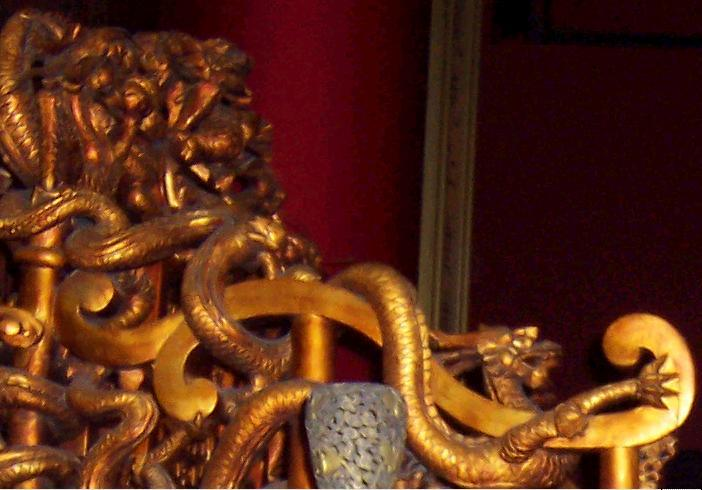
Detail of the Dragon Throne used by the Qianlong Emperor of China, Forbidden City, Qing dynasty. Artifact circulating in U.S. museums on loan from Beijing

Asian art, music, as well as literature, are important parts of Asian culture. Harmonic music can follow the pentatonic scale as well as the twelve-tone scale; percussive music can use cymbals as well as gongs, in Asia.

Architecture

In Japan, the temples of Kyoto and Nara might be over 1,000 years old in style, but are completely rebuilt, in the same style, every few generations or so. The primary reason for this was that the materials might be wood and thatch rather than stone and tile.

Other cultures might build from stone, but the jungles and forests might overgrow the buildings, as in Angkor Wat.

Literature

Early-Modern Japanese literature (17th–19th centuries) developed innovations such as haiku, a form of Japanese poetry that evolved from the ancient hokku (Japanese language: 発句) mode. Haiku consists of three lines: the first and third lines each have five morae (the rough phonological equivalent of syllables), while the second has seven. Original haiku masters included such figures as Edo period poet Matsuo Bashō (松尾芭蕉); others influenced by Bashō include Kobayashi Issa and Masaoka Shiki.

Dance

In Punjab, India, bhangra is popular.

In all countries in Southeast Asia, dance is an integral part of the culture. There are courtly dances, found, for example, wherever there are Rajahs and princesses. There are also dances of celebration. For example, according to oral history, in 1212, when 10 Bornean datus left the rule of Sri Vijayan empire on Borneo, they sailed away and negotiated settlement rights with the chieftain of the Negritos on the island of Panay. In commemoration of the agreement, they danced; the Negritos danced as well.

Music

The music of Central Asia is as vast and unique as the many cultures and peoples who inhabit the region. The one constant throughout the musical landscape is Islam, which defines the music's focus and the musicians' inspiration.

Principal instrument types are two- or three-stringed lutes, the necks either fretted or fretless; fiddles made of horsehair; flutes, mostly open at both ends and either end-blown or side-blown; and jaw harps, either metal or, often in Siberia, wooden. Percussion instruments include frame drums, tambourines, and kettledrums.

Instrumental polyphony is achieved primarily by lutes and fiddles. On the other hand, vocal polyphony is achieved in different ways: Bashkirs hum a basic pitch while playing solo flute.

== Europe ==
Europe has been a cradle for many cultural innovations and movements, often at odds with each other such as Christian proselytism and Humanism, that have consequently been spread across the globe. The Renaissance of classical ideas influenced the development of art and literature far beyond the confines of the continent.

== Latin America ==
=== Visual art ===
Beyond the rich tradition of indigenous art, the development of Latin American visual art owed much to the influence of Spanish, Portuguese and French Baroque painting, which in turn often followed the trends of the Italian Masters. In general, this artistic Eurocentrism began to fade in the early twentieth century, as Latin-Americans began to acknowledge the uniqueness of their condition and started to follow their own path.

An important artistic movement generated in Latin America is Muralismo represented by Diego Rivera, David Alfaro Siqueiros, José Clemente Orozco and Rufino Tamayo in Mexico and Santiago Martinez Delgado and Pedro Nel Gómez in Colombia. Some impressive Muralista works can be found also in a number of cities in the USA.

Mexican painter Frida Kahlo remains by far the most known and famous Latin American artist.. Kahlo's work commands the highest selling price of all Latin American paintings.

=== Literature ===
What really put Latin American literature on the global map was no doubt the literary boom of the 1960s and 1970s, distinguished by daring and experimental novels (such as Julio Cortázar's Rayuela (1963)) that were frequently published in Spain and quickly translated into English. The Boom's defining novel was Gabriel García Márquez's Cien años de soledad (1967), which led to the association of Latin American literature with magic realism, though other important writers of the period such as Mario Vargas Llosa and Carlos Fuentes do not fit so easily within this framework. Arguably, the Boom's culmination was Augusto Roa Bastos's monumental Yo, el supremo (1974). In the wake of the Boom, influential precursors such as Juan Rulfo, Alejo Carpentier, and above all Jorge Luis Borges were also rediscovered.

Contemporary literature in the region is vibrant and varied, ranging from the best-selling Paulo Coelho and Isabel Allende to the more avant-garde and critically acclaimed work of writers such as Diamela Eltit, Ricardo Piglia, or Roberto Bolaño. There has also been considerable attention paid to the genre of testimonio, texts produced in collaboration with subaltern subjects such as Rigoberta Menchú. Finally, a new breed of chroniclers is represented by the more journalistic Carlos Monsiváis and Pedro Lemebel.

The region boasts five Nobel Prizewinners: in addition to the Colombian García Márquez (1982), also the Chilean poet Gabriela Mistral (1945), the Guatemalan novelist Miguel Ángel Asturias (1967), the Chilean poet Pablo Neruda (1971), and the Mexican poet and essayist Octavio Paz (1990).

=== Music ===
One of the main characteristics of Latin American music is its diversity, from the lively rhythms of Central America and the Caribbean to the more austere sounds of southern South America. Another feature of Latin American music is its original blending of the variety of styles that arrived in The Americas and became influential, from the early Spanish and European Baroque to the different beats of the African rhythms.

Hispano-Caribbean music, such as salsa, merengue, bachata, etc., are styles of music that have been strongly influenced by African rhythms and melodies.

Arguably, the main contribution to music entered through folklore, where the true soul of the Latin American and Caribbean countries is expressed. Musicians such as Atahualpa Yupanqui, Violeta Parra, Victor Jara, Mercedes Sosa, Jorge Negrete, Caetano Veloso, and others gave magnificent examples of the heights that this soul can reach.

Latin pop, including many forms of rock, is popular in Latin America today (see Spanish language rock and roll).

== Oceania ==
Oceania is the home of the Pasifika Festival, an annual event which draws artists from throughout the region to celebrate Pacific art and culture.

Australia

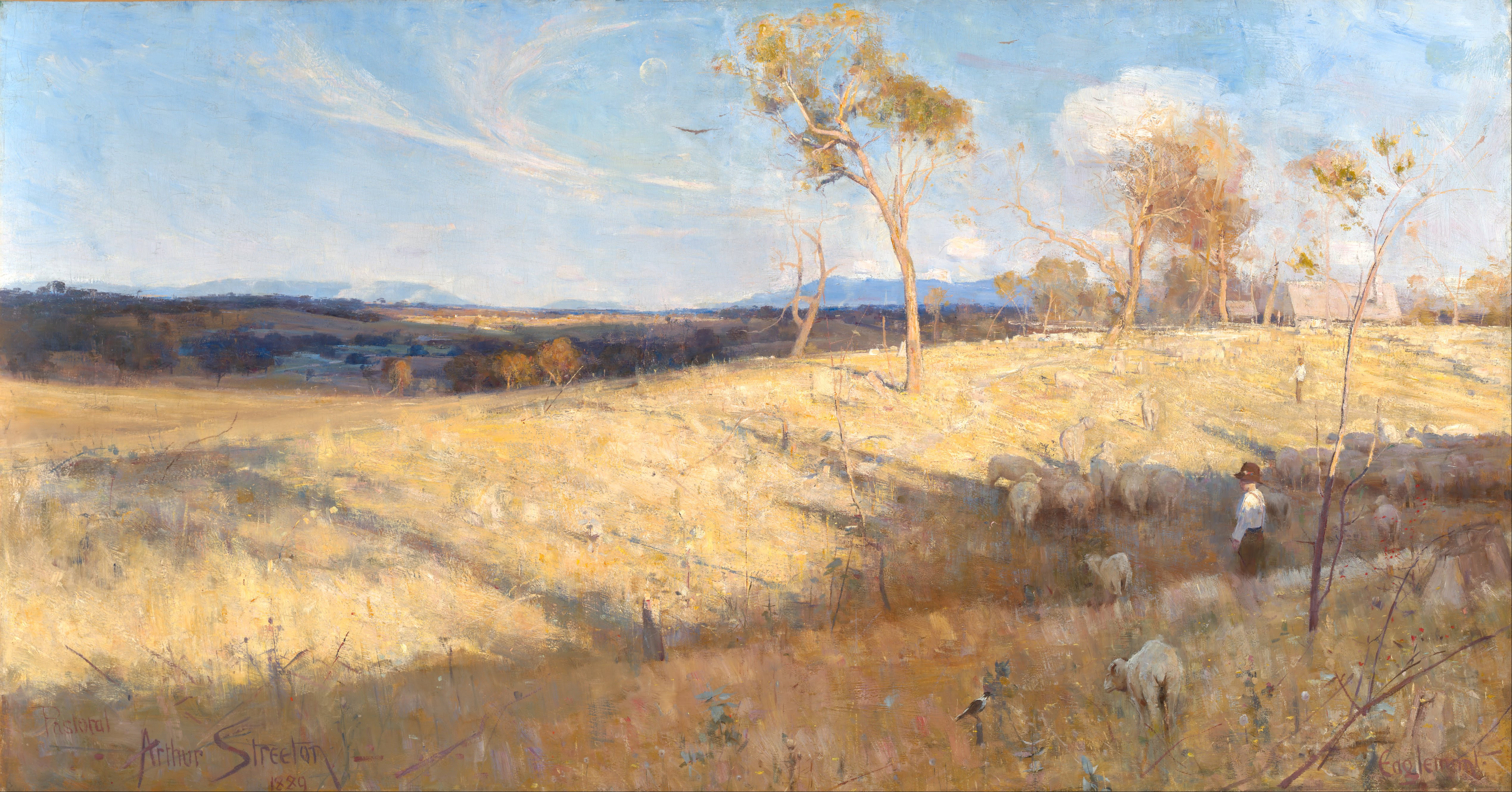
Golden Summer, Eaglemont (Eaglemont, Victoria) by Arthur Streeton (1889) is an early example of the rich tradition of Australian landscape painting.

The primary basis of Australian culture up until the mid-20th century was Anglo-Celtic, although distinctive Australian features had been evolving from the environment and indigenous culture. Over the past 50 years, Australian culture has been strongly influenced by American popular culture (particularly television and cinema), large-scale immigration from non-English-speaking countries, and Australia's Asian neighbours. The vigour and originality of the arts in Australia — films, opera, music, painting, theatre, dance, and crafts — achieve international recognition.

Australia has a long history of visual arts, starting with the cave and bark paintings of its indigenous peoples. From the time of European settlement, a common theme in Australian art has been the Australian landscape, seen in the works of Arthur Streeton, Arthur Boyd and Albert Namatjira, among others. The traditions of indigenous Australians are largely transmitted orally and are closely tied to ceremony and the telling of the stories of the Dreamtime. Australian Aboriginal music, dance and art have a palpable influence on contemporary Australian visual and performing arts. Australia has an active tradition of music, ballet and theatre; many of its performing arts companies receive public funding through the federal government's Australia Council. There is a symphony orchestra in each capital city, and a national opera company, Opera Australia, first made prominent by the renowned diva Dame Joan Sutherland; Australian music includes classical, jazz, and many popular music genres.

Australian literature has also been influenced by the landscape; the works of writers such as Banjo Paterson and Henry Lawson captured the experience of the Australian bush. The character of colonial Australia, as embodied in early literature, resonates with modern Australia and its perceived emphasis on egalitarianism, mateship, and anti-authoritarianism. In 1973, Patrick White was awarded the Nobel Prize in Literature, the only Australian to have achieved this; he is recognised as one of the great English-language writers of the twentieth century. Australian English is a major variety of the language; its grammar and spelling are largely based on those of British English, overlaid with a rich vernacular of unique lexical items and phrases, some of which have found their way into standard English.

Papua New Guinea

Contemporary Papua New Guinean art is notable for its wood carving, drawing and painting. Famous visual artists include Mathias Kauage, Timothy Akis and Larry Santana.

Papua New Guinea is also noted for its varied music styles, from sing-sing to hymns (Blasius To Una), to string pop music (Paramana Strangers) and reggae (Anslom Nakikus). Sanguma's music combines traditional and Western inspirations, as does George Telek's.

Papua New Guinea's first published poet was Allan Natachee; the country's first published novelist was Sir Vincent Eri.

Solomon Islands

Contemporary music in the Solomon Islands features traditional Melanesian music, as well as rock, reggae and Christian music. Sharzy is a leading Solomon Islands musician.

The Solomon Islands are less noted for their visual arts, although painter Ake Lianga has achieved international renown.

Fiji

Vilsoni Hereniko is arguably his country's best-known playwright. He is also a film director, who wrote and directed Fiji's first ever feature film, The Land Has Eyes (Pear ta ma 'on maf).

Polynesia

Polynesian countries have produced several internationally famous writers, including Samoa's Albert Wendt and Sia Figiel, and Niue's John Pule. Pule is also an artist, whose artwork includes painting, drawing, printmaking, film-making and performance.
