= Music of the Solomon Islands =

The music of Solomon Islands has received international attention since before the country became independent from the United Kingdom in 1978.

== Traditional music ==
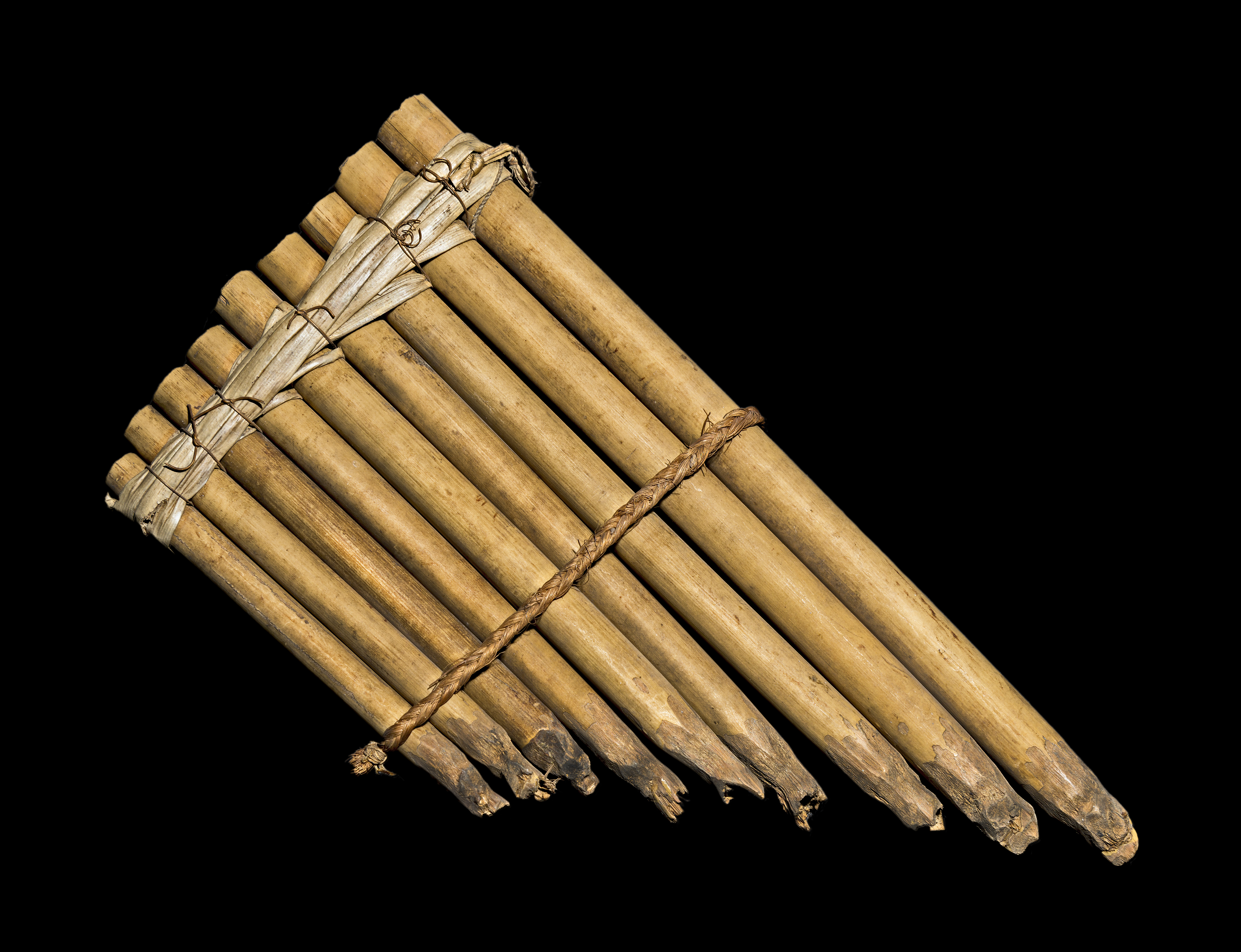
A pan flute, nineteenth century, MHNT.

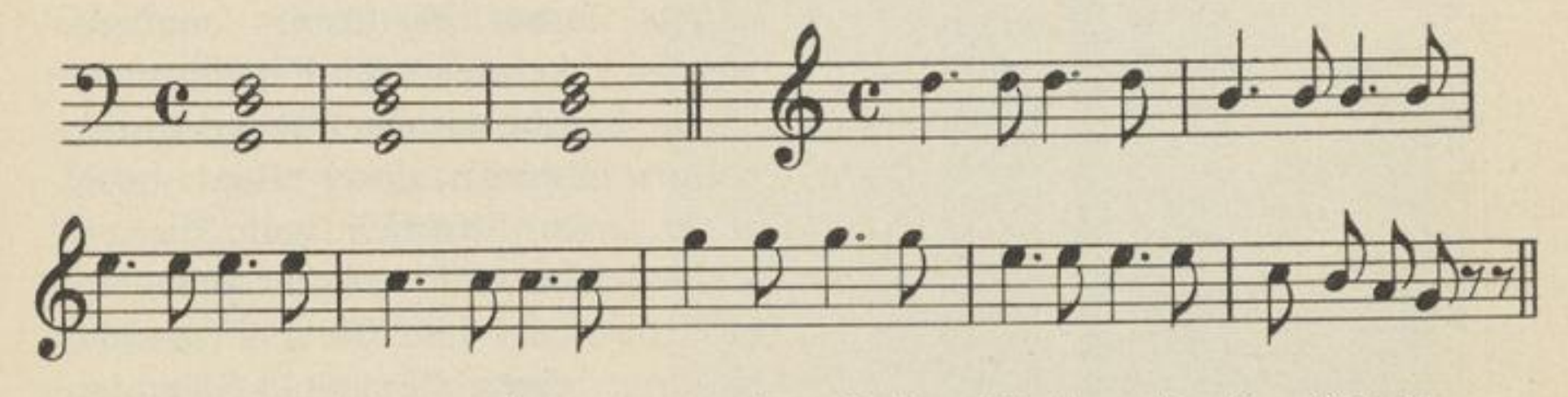
Sheet music for a traditional Melanesian flute song from the Solomon Islands

Traditional Melanesian music in Solomon Islands includes both group and solo vocals, slit-drum and panpipe ensembles. These musical traditions have been extensively described and documented by ethnomusicologist Hugo Zemp.

Panpipe orchestras, which are well known on Malaita and Guadalcanal use up to ten performers with different instrument, each with unique tunings. During rituals, sometimes up to forty people could be playing a pan flute song together while dancing.

The traditional flute music of Solomon Islands was admired by some early European visitors, including the German explorer Carl Ribbe in 1903, who described one song as "rather pleasant".

== Popular music ==
In the 1920s bamboo music gained a following in several countries. Bamboo music was made by hitting open-ended bamboo tubes of varying sizes, originally with coconut husks. After American soldiers brought their sandals to the Solomon Islands, these replaced coconut husks by the early 1960s, just as the music began spreading to Papua New Guinea.

In the 1950s, Edwin Nanau Sitori composed the song "Walkabout long Chinatown", which was to become popular throughout the Pacific, and has been referred to by the government as the unofficial "national song" of Solomon Islands.

Modern Solomon Islander popular music includes various kinds of rock and reggae as well as something known as island music, a guitar and ukulele ensemble format influenced by Polynesian and Christian music.

Traditional Melanesian choir singing features heavily in the soundtrack of the film The Thin Red Line, which is set against the backdrop of the Battle for Guadalcanal.

=== Rorogwela ===
In 1969/1970, ethnomusicologist Hugo Zemp recorded a number of local songs which were released on an LP in 1973, as a part of the UNESCO Musical Sources collection. One of the songs, a lullaby named "Rorogwela", sung by Afunakwa, a Northern Malaita woman, was used as a vocal sample in a 1992 single "Sweet Lullaby" by the French electronica duo Deep Forest, becoming a worldwide hit but also causing some controversy over perceived "pillaging" of the world music heritage by Western musicians. This is because while the single went on to be successful, Afunakwa was not originally credited for singing the vocal sample. Deep Forest claimed they had asked permission of her to use her voice on their single, but it was later revealed she was never consulted before the song was made.

Rorogwela's melody was also used in Jan Garbarek's "Pygmy Lullaby". It was named as such because he thought the melody used in Deep Forest's "Sweet Lullaby" was African. Later, when he learned the melody was actually from Solomon Islands, he agreed to no longer refer to it as "Pygmy Lullaby". Also, he did not use the vocal track by Afunakwa, only the melody from the song.

The lyrics to Rorogwela translate to: Young sibling, young sibling, be quiet You are crying, but our father has left us He has gone to the place of the dead To protect the living, to protect the orphan child.

== Music institutions ==
There is a Wantok Music Festival.

== Solomon Islander musicians ==
- Sharzy
- Dezine
- Jahboy
- 56 Hop Rod
- Rosie Delmah
- DMP
- Onetox
- Jah Roots
- Native Stonage
- T cage
- Jambeat
- Sisiva
- Henzii
- Islestone
- Taine Gee
- Vania
- Saba
- Kumara Vibes
- Zabana Ambassadas
- Sean Rii
- Jaro Local
- Young Davie
- Joe Briz
- Bibao
- Reesa
- Ramo
- Tipa
- Elexter
- Young Davie

== Notes and references ==
=== References ===
- Feld, Steven. "Bamboo Boogie-Woogie". 2000. In Broughton, Simon and Ellingham, Mark with McConnachie, James and Duane, Orla (Ed.), World Music, Vol. 2: Latin & North America, Caribbean, India, Asia and Pacific, pp 183–188. Rough Guides Ltd, Penguin Books. ISBN 1-85828-636-0

=== Further reading ===
- Firth, Raymond; McLean, Mervyn (1991). Tikopia Songs: Poetic and Musical Art of a Polynesian People in the Solomon Islands. Cambridge University Press. ISBN 0-521-39812-6.

=== External links ===
- In search of Afunakwa on YouTube
- Sisiva - Tutuani on YouTube
