= Artist =

Person creating art or practicing the arts

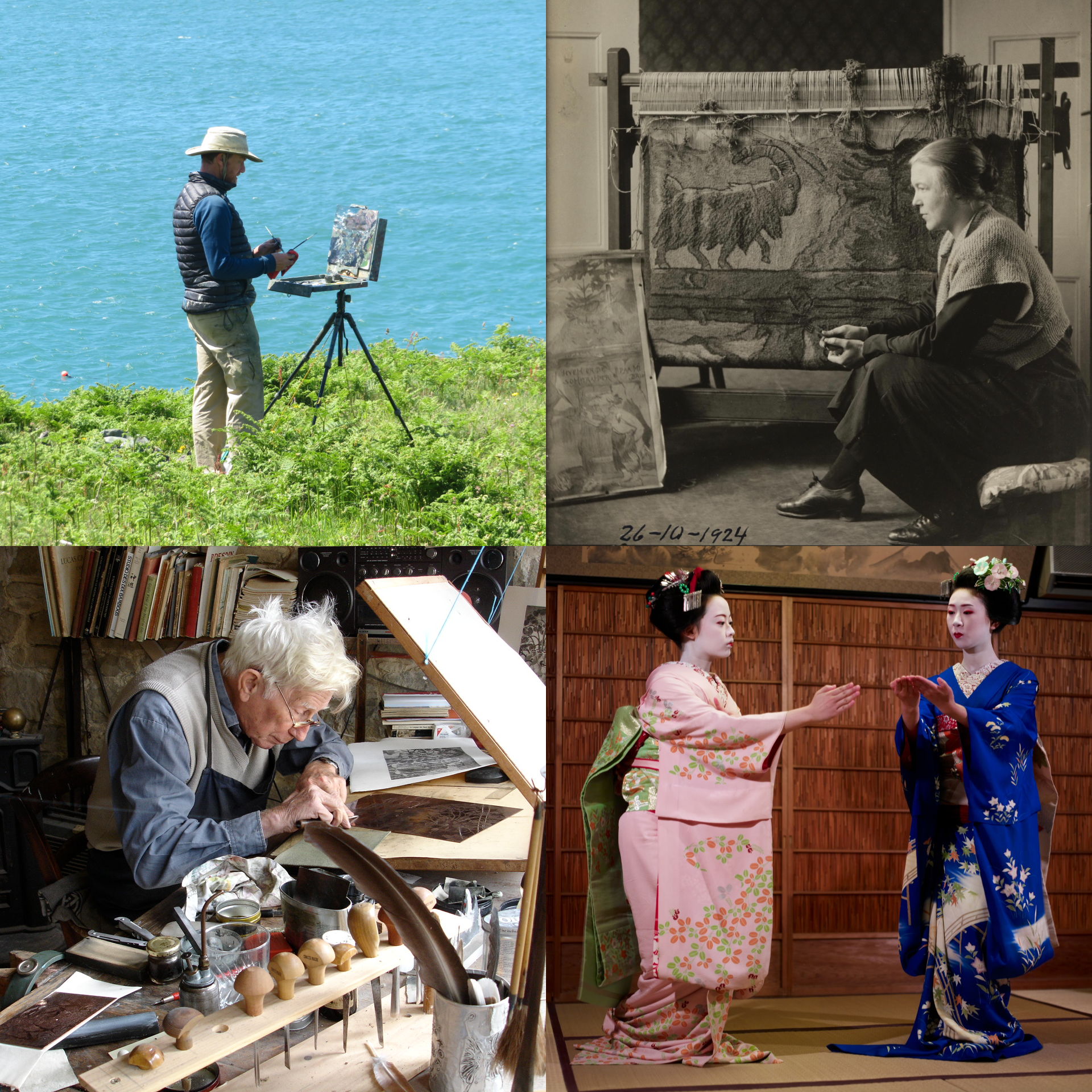
A collage of artists from different time periods and locations

An artist is a person who creates art or practices the arts. The most common usage in everyday speech and academic discourse refers to a practitioner of the visual arts, such as painting or drawing.

The term is also widely used in the entertainment business to refer to actors, musicians, singers, dancers, and other performers. The French word artiste is sometimes used in English in this context, although this has become old-fashioned. The use of the term "artist" to describe writers is valid, but less common, and mostly restricted to contexts such as critics' reviews; "author" is generally used instead.

While the use of the word 'artist' is common, there is no agreed upon definition of art—this makes the definition of who is and is not an artist indeterminate. Artists and philosophers still debate their interpretation of art's definition—on what does and does not count as art.

I am only pointing out that my project, like Collingwood's, Osborne's, and others', is metaphysical in nature. I am interested in trying to find out what a work of art is and what it is essentially.

— James C. Anderson, Aesthetic Concepts of Art, Theories of Art Today page 68

== Dictionary definitions and etymology ==
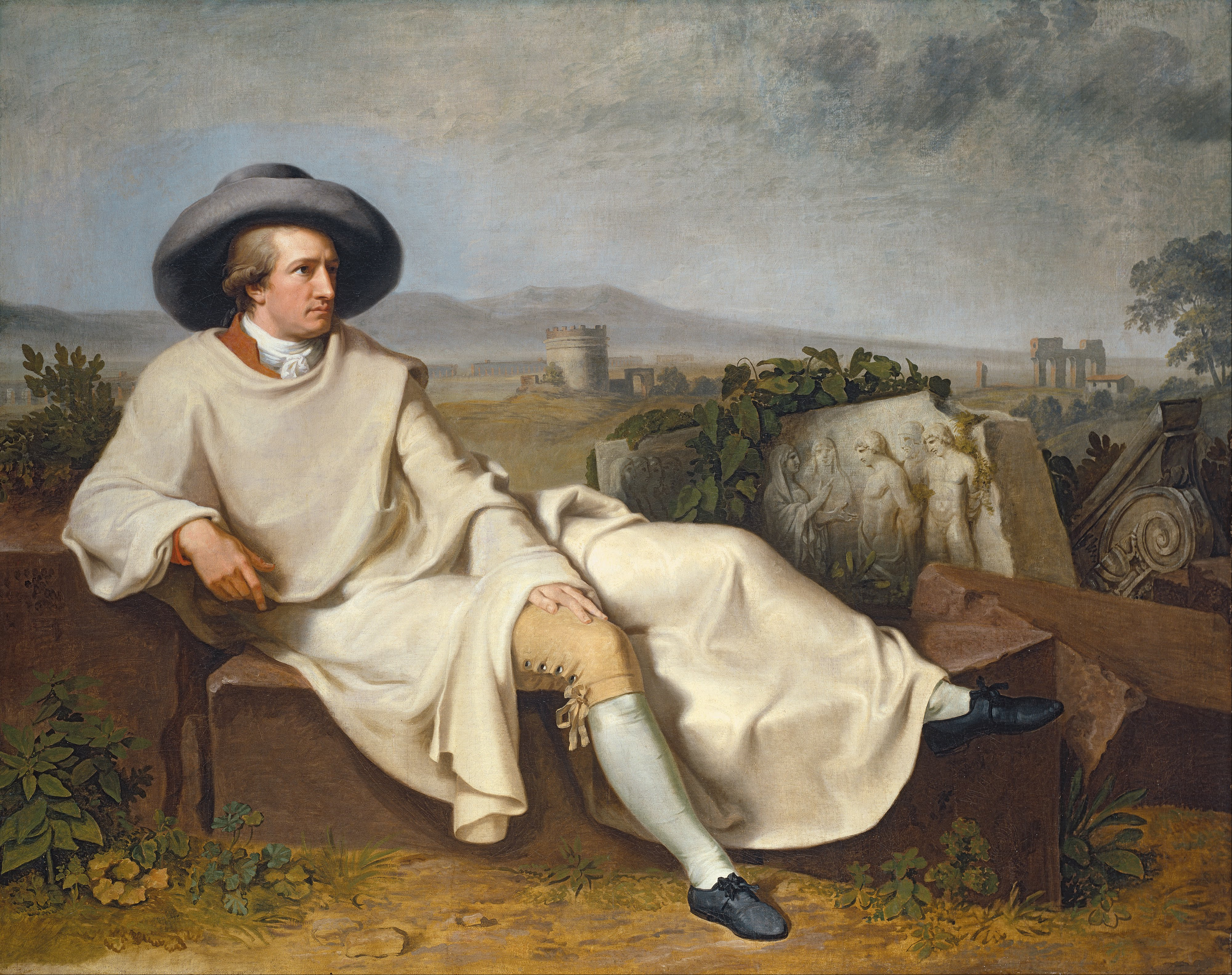
Johann Heinrich Wilhelm Tischbein, Goethe in the Roman Campagna, 1787 – portrait of Johann Wolfgang von Goethe, a German author known for his works of poetry, drama, and prose, on philosophy, the visual arts, and science

The Oxford English Dictionary defines the older, broader meanings of the word "artist":

- a learned person or Master of Arts,
- one who pursues a practical science, traditionally medicine, astrology, alchemy, chemistry,
- a follower of a pursuit in which skill comes by study or practice,
- a follower of a manual art, such as a mechanic,
- one who makes their craft a fine art, or
- one who cultivates one of the fine arts–traditionally, the arts presided over by the muses

The Britannica Dictionary defines "artist" as:

- a person who creates art,
- a person who is skilled at drawing, painting, etc.,
- a skilled performer, or
- a person who is very good at something

The Cambridge Dictionary defines the word as:

- someone who paints, draws, or makes sculptures,
- someone who performs music, or
- someone who creates things with great skill and imagination

The word artist is derived from Middle French artiste, which was borrowed from Medieval Latin artista, from Latin art- (ars) + -ista. The earliest known usage of the word as an noun is from the mid 1500s and as a adjective from the early 1660s. The Greek word techně (Greek: τέχνη, romanized: tékhnē, lit. 'art, skill, craft'; Ancient Greek: [tékʰnɛː], Modern Greek: [ˈtexni]), often translated as "art", implies mastery of any sort of craft.

== History of the concept ==
=== Ancient Greece ===
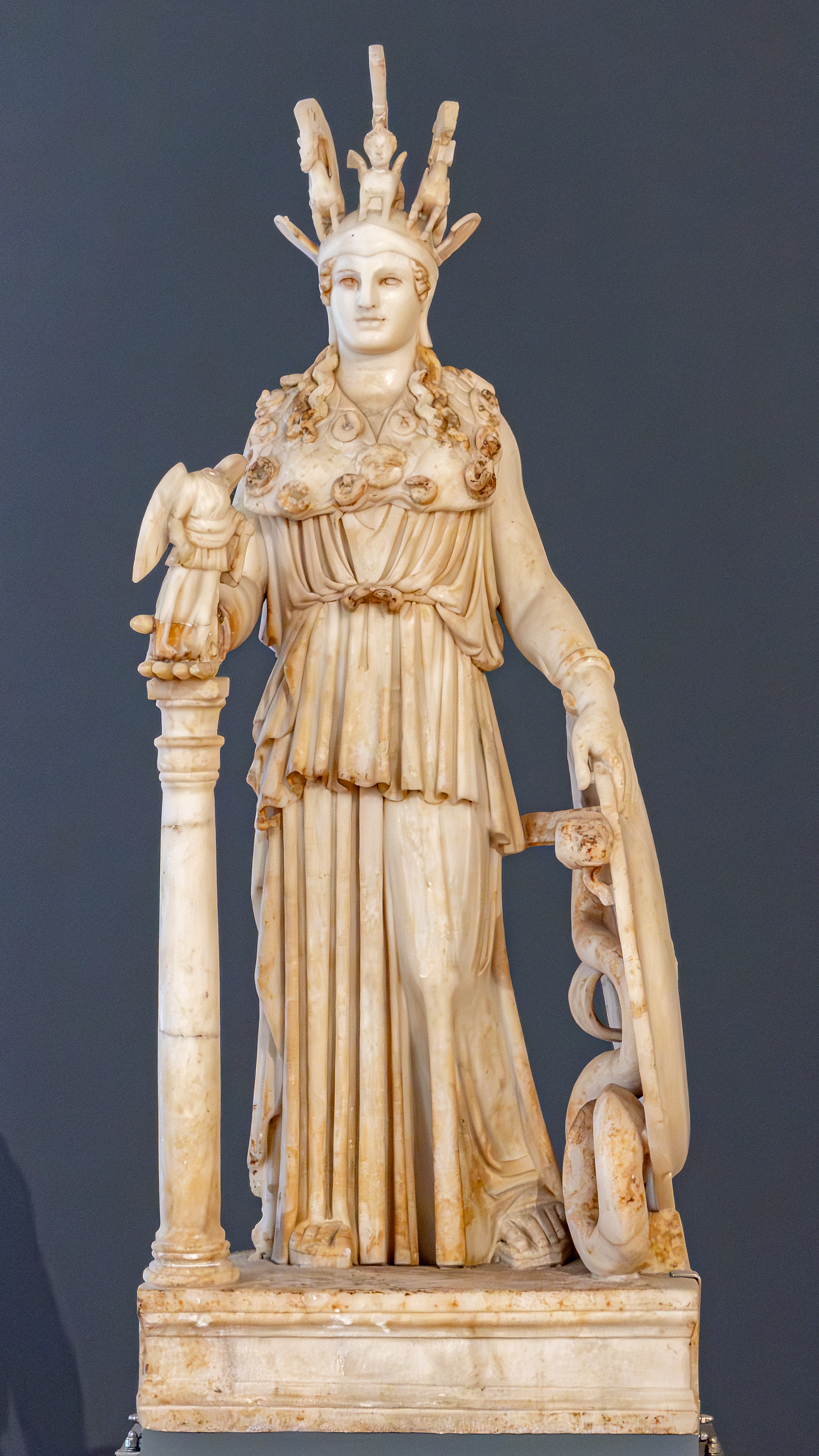
The Varvakeion Athena, a Roman-era statue of Athena Parthenos considered to be the most faithful reproduction of the chryselephantine statue made by Pheidias and his assistants, as displayed in the National Archaeological Museum, Athens

In Greek culture, each of the nine Muses oversaw a different field of human creation:

- Calliope (the "beautiful of speech"): chief of the muses and muse of epic or heroic poetry
- Clio (the "glorious one"): muse of history
- Erato (the "amorous one"): muse of love or erotic poetry, lyrics, and marriage songs
- Euterpe (the "well-pleasing"): muse of music and lyric poetry
- Melpomene (the "chanting one"): muse of tragedy
- Polyhymnia or Polymnia (the "[singer] of many hymns"): muse of sacred song, oratory, lyric, singing, and rhetoric
- Terpsichore (the "[one who] delights in dance"): muse of choral song and dance
- Thalia (the "blossoming one"): muse of comedy and bucolic poetry
- Urania (the "celestial one"): muse of astronomy

No muse was identified with the visual arts of painting and sculpture. In ancient Greece, sculptors and painters were held in low regard, the work often performed by slaves and mostly regarded as mere manual labour.

Even if you should become a Pheidias or a Polykleitos and should create many marvellous works, everyone will praise your skill for sure, but none of your admirers, if he had sense, would want to be like you; for whoever you might become, you would still be considered a laborer, a man who lives by his hands and has nothing but his hands.

— Lucian of Samosata, The Dream, or Lucian's Career, Lucian, vol. III, page 223

=== Middle Ages ===
During the Middle Ages the word artist already existed in some countries such as Italy, but the meaning was something resembling craftsman, while the word artisan was still unknown. An artist was someone able to do a work better than others, so the skilled excellency was underlined, rather than the activity field. In this period, some "artisanal" products (such as textiles) were much more precious and expensive than paintings or sculptures.

The first division into major and minor arts dates back at least to the works of Leon Battista Alberti (1404–1472): De re aedificatoria, De statua, De pictura, which focused on the importance of the intellectual skills of the artist rather than the manual skills (even if in other forms of art there was a project behind).

=== Modern era ===
With the academies in Europe (second half of 17th century) the gap between fine and applied arts was definitely set.

Many contemporary definitions of "artist" and "art" are highly contingent on culture, resisting aesthetic prescription; in the same way, the features constituting beauty and the beautiful cannot be standardized easily without moving into kitsch.

== Artists' definitions ==
Some artists explain their beliefs about art or in being an artist. These beliefs may compel them to take actions outside of the act(s) of creating art but are still related to their work.

Doechii (Jaylah Ji'mya Hickmon) is an American singer, songwriter, and rapper who won Best Female Artist in 2025 at the BET Awards. She stated her position as an artist requires civic responsibility while receiving this award.

I feel it's my responsibility as an artist to use this moment to speak up for all oppressed people. For Black people, for Latino people, for trans people, for the people in Gaza. We all deserve to live in hope and not in fear, and I hope we stand together, my brothers and my sisters, against hate, and we protest against it.

— Jaylah Ji'mya Hickmon, Doechii Takes Center Stage As Winner Of Best Female Hip Hop Artist!, BET Awards '25 Ceremony

A single artist may create an art manifesto to explain their work while multiple artists may join or start art movements of ideologically aligned people to create a set of guidelines or rules to follow when making art.

One of them is the Manifesto of Futurism, created by an Italian poet called Filippo Tommaso Marinetti in 1909. It lists 11 declarations of what Futurism means and then goes on to explain in further detail. He discussed the progress of automobiles, steamers, and aeroplanes and how it created new beauty—speed. He believed literature would be absorbed, not overshadowed, by such progress. Literature and poetry would become an aggressive force against the world.

This manifesto partially inspired people to choose fascism in Italy. "From the 1920s to the 1940s he [Filippo Tommaso Marinetti] allied himself with the Fascist leader Benito Mussolini. Sharing a vision of a new Italy empowered by national and cultural supremacy, they relied on each other for inspiration and collaboration. Marinetti hoped that by supporting Fascism, Futurism would win the backing of the regime, become the official art of the state..."

9. We will glorify war — the only true hygiene of the world — militarism, patriotism, the destructive gesture of anarchist, the beautiful Ideas which kill, and the scorn of woman. 10. We will destroy museums, libraries and fight against moralism, feminism and all utilitarian cowardice.

— Filippo Tommaso Marinetti, DECLARATION OF FUTURISM, Poesia, Volume 5, Number 6, April 1909

== Education and employment ==
=== India ===
India, Mughal, 17th century - The dream of Zulaykha, from the Amber Album at the Cleveland Museum of Art

In 1556 a new leader was given control of Delhi who would create a major shift in the design, construction, and aesthetics of Indian art—12 year old Akbar. He formed a royal manuscript atelier (modern-day term: artist collective) consisting of 30 painters and 70 assistants from Central Asia, India, and Persia. Their earliest works had them work in teams to create large pieces for public instead of private viewing. "Each illumination focuses on a single dramatic episode, which retains its primacy even if it is set among a host of subsidiary vignettes."

=== United States ===
The US Bureau of Labor Statistics classifies many visual artists as either craft artists or fine artists. A craft artist makes handmade functional works of art, such as pottery or clothing. A fine artist makes paintings, illustrations (such as book illustrations or medical illustrations), sculptures, or similar artistic works primarily for their aesthetic value.

The main source of skill for both craft artists and fine artists is long-term repetition and practice. Many fine artists have studied their art form at university, and some have a master's degree in fine arts. Artists may also study on their own or receive on-the-job training from an experienced artist.

The number of available jobs as an artist is increasing more slowly than in other fields. About half of US artists are self-employed. Others work in a variety of industries. For example, a pottery manufacturer will employ craft artists, and book publishers will hire illustrators.

In the US, craft and fine artists have a median income of approximately US$56,260 per year. This compares to US$61,000 for all art-related fields, including related jobs such as graphic designers, multimedia artists, animators, and fashion designers. Many artists work part-time as artists and hold a second job.

== See also ==
- Art history
- Arts by region
- Artist in Residence
- Humanities
- List of painters by name
- List of painters
- List of photographers
- List of composers
- List of sculptors
- Mathematics and art
- Starving artist
- Tattoo artist
- Tortured artist
