= Music of Papua New Guinea =

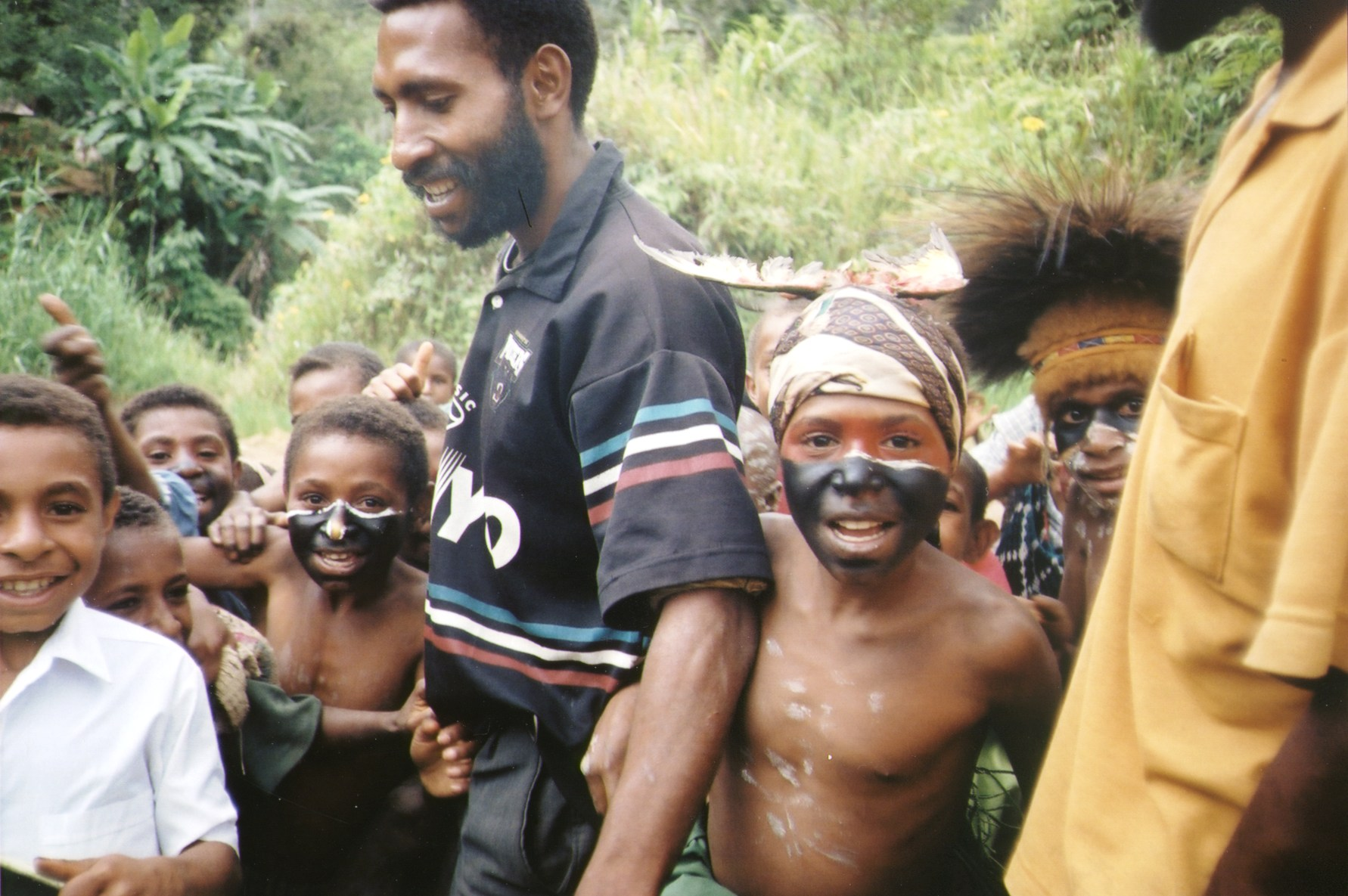
Children dressed for a sing-sing in 2003

The music of Papua New Guinea has a long history.

== Traditional music ==
After independence, the outside world knew little of the diverse peoples' traditional music genres. The first commercial release to see an international audience did not occur until 1991, when percussionist Mickey Hart's Voices of the Rainforest was released.

After 1872, foreigners introduced Christian hymns, including Gregorian chanting. Peroveta anedia, ute and taibubu, all forms of Polynesian music, were also introduced in this period. The Gold Rush brought an influx of Australian miners who brought with them the mouth organ.

Traditional celebrations, which include song, dance, feasting and gift-giving, are called sing-sing. Vibrant and colorful costumes adorn the dancers, while a leader and a chorus sing a staggered approach to the same song, producing a fugue-like effect. 1993 saw television spreading across the country, and American popular music continued to affect Papuan music given the diffusion of radio since World War II. Since 1953, singsings have become competitive in nature, with contests occurring in Port Moresby, Mt. Hagen and Goroka. 1949 saw the first Papuan to achieve international fame, Blasius To Una, begin his career.

By the end of the 1970s, a local recording industry had appeared and artists such as Sanguma and later George Telek began mixing native and Western styles like rock and jazz.

=== Sing-sing photos and traditional instruments ===
Below are pictures from Papua New Guinea and Papua Indonesia.

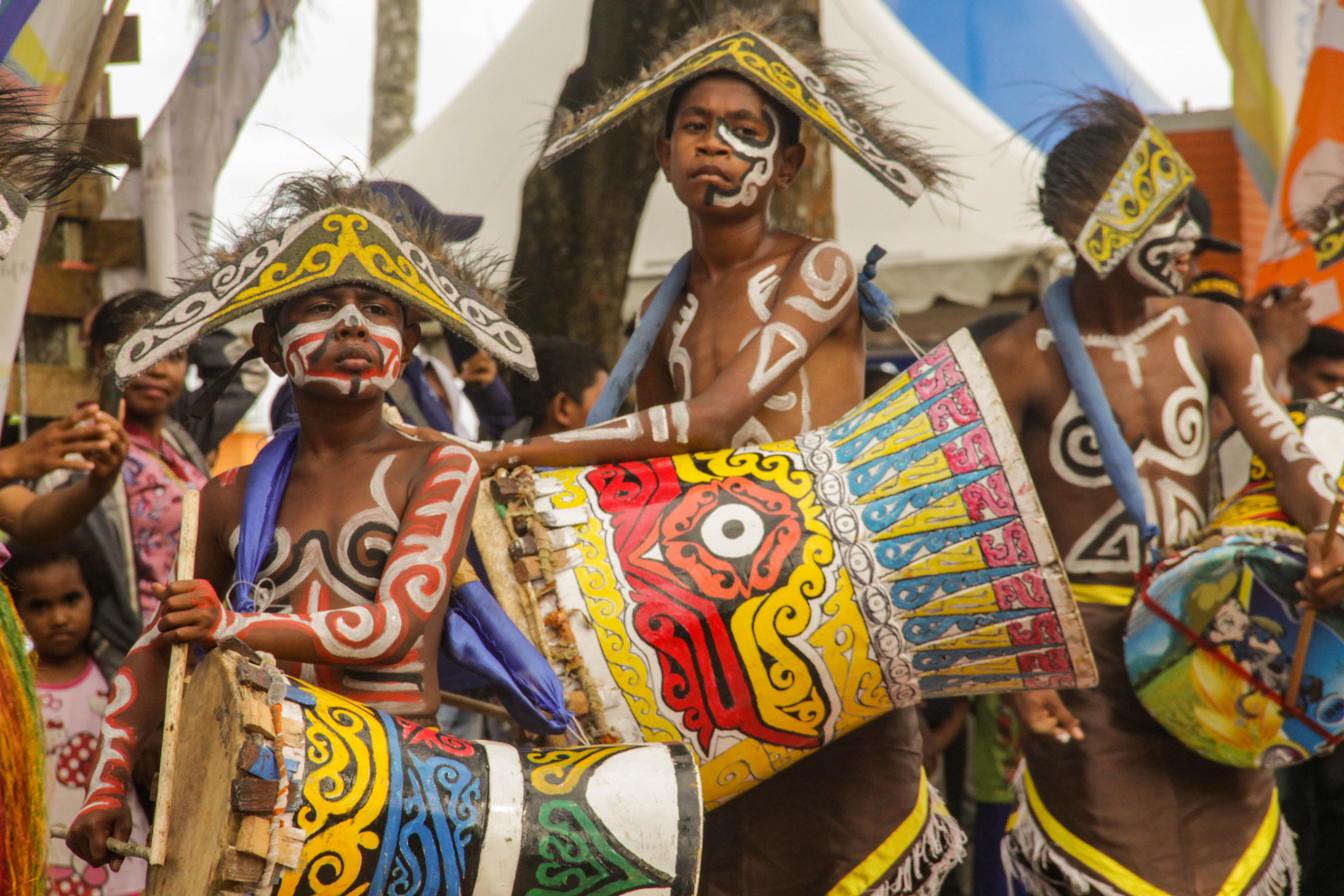
Tifa drummers, part of a tambur-flute ensemble. Such a group can include several tifa drummers, several flute players, and one leader of the line

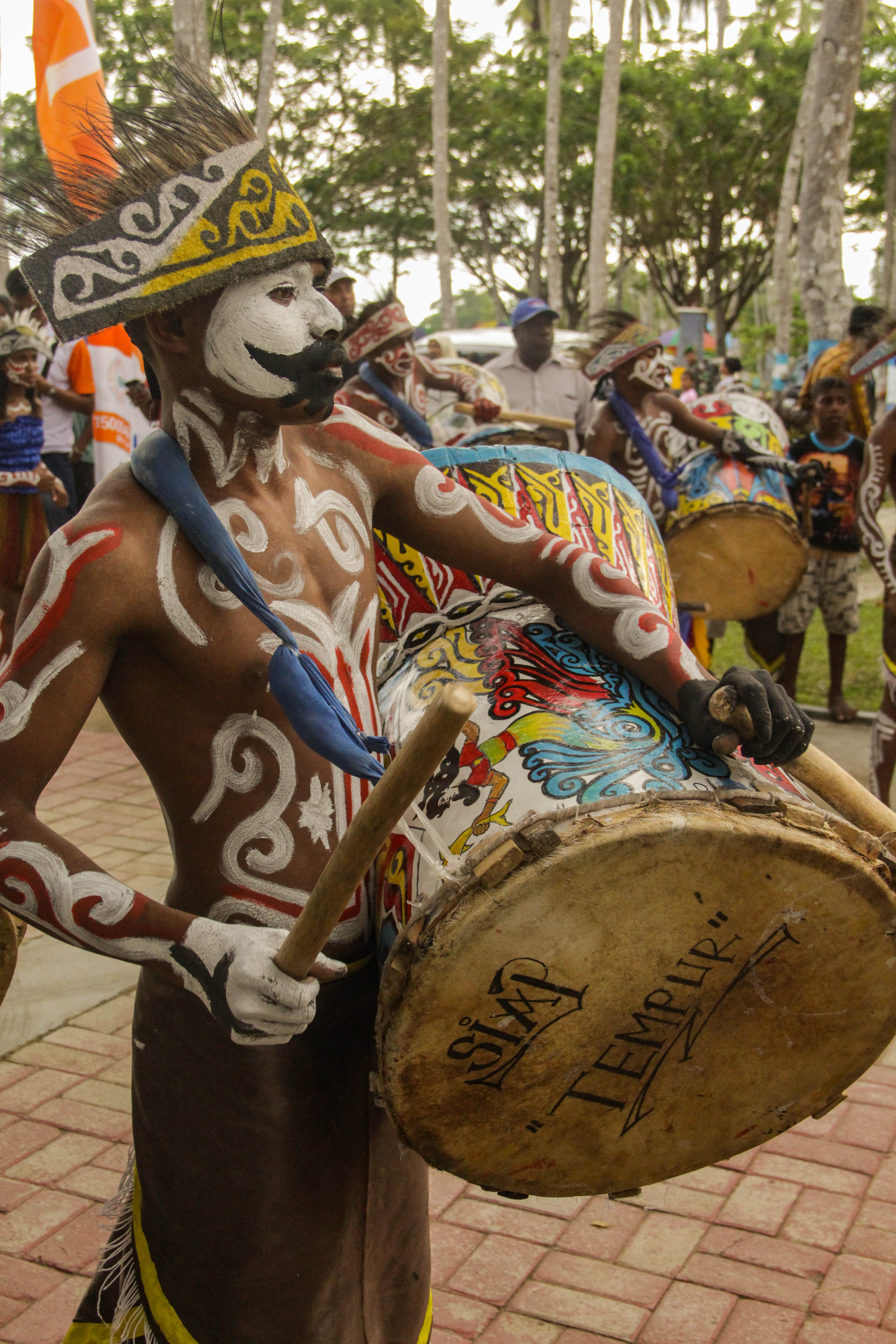
Tifa drummer

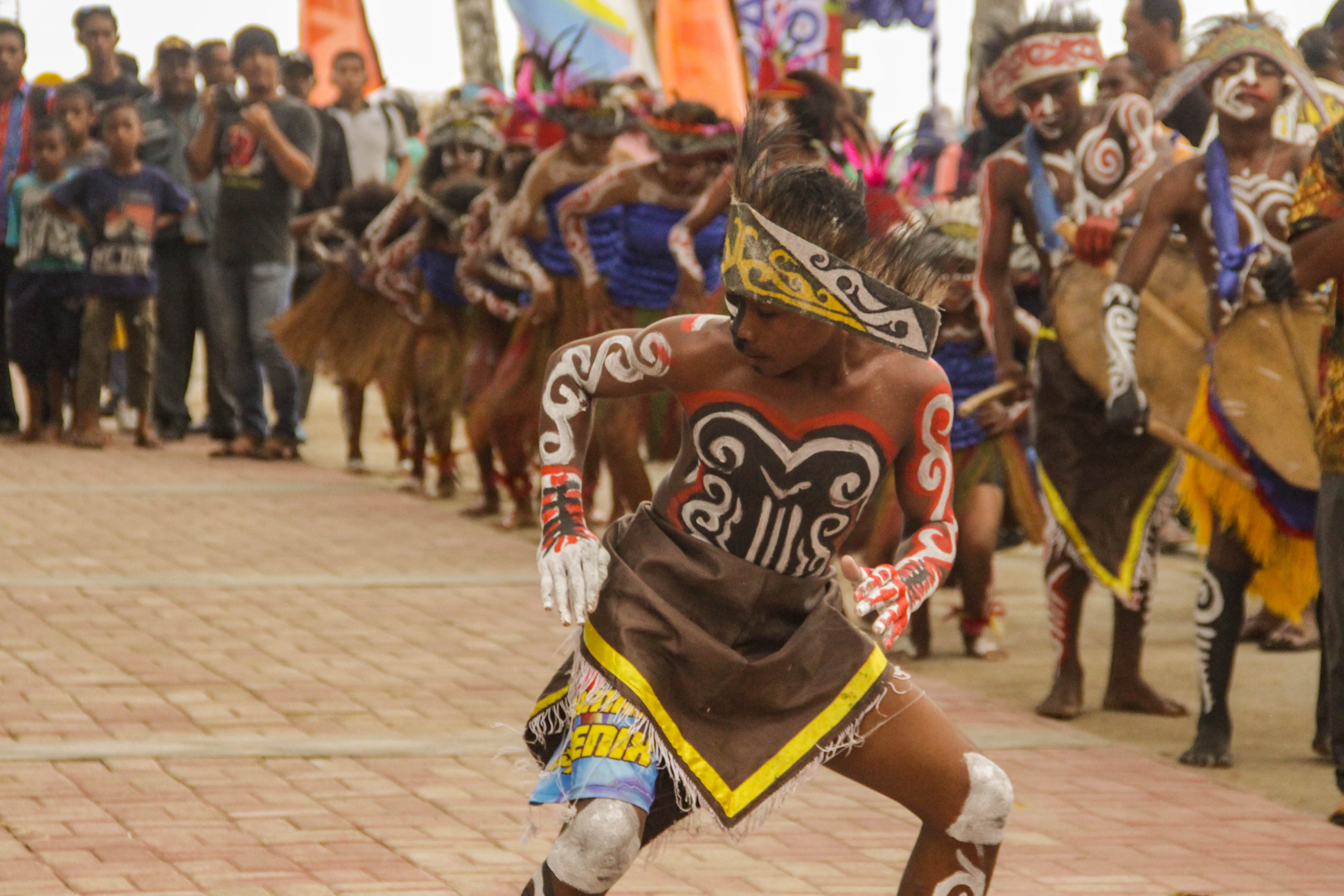
Leader of the line of a suling tambur (flute drum) combination.

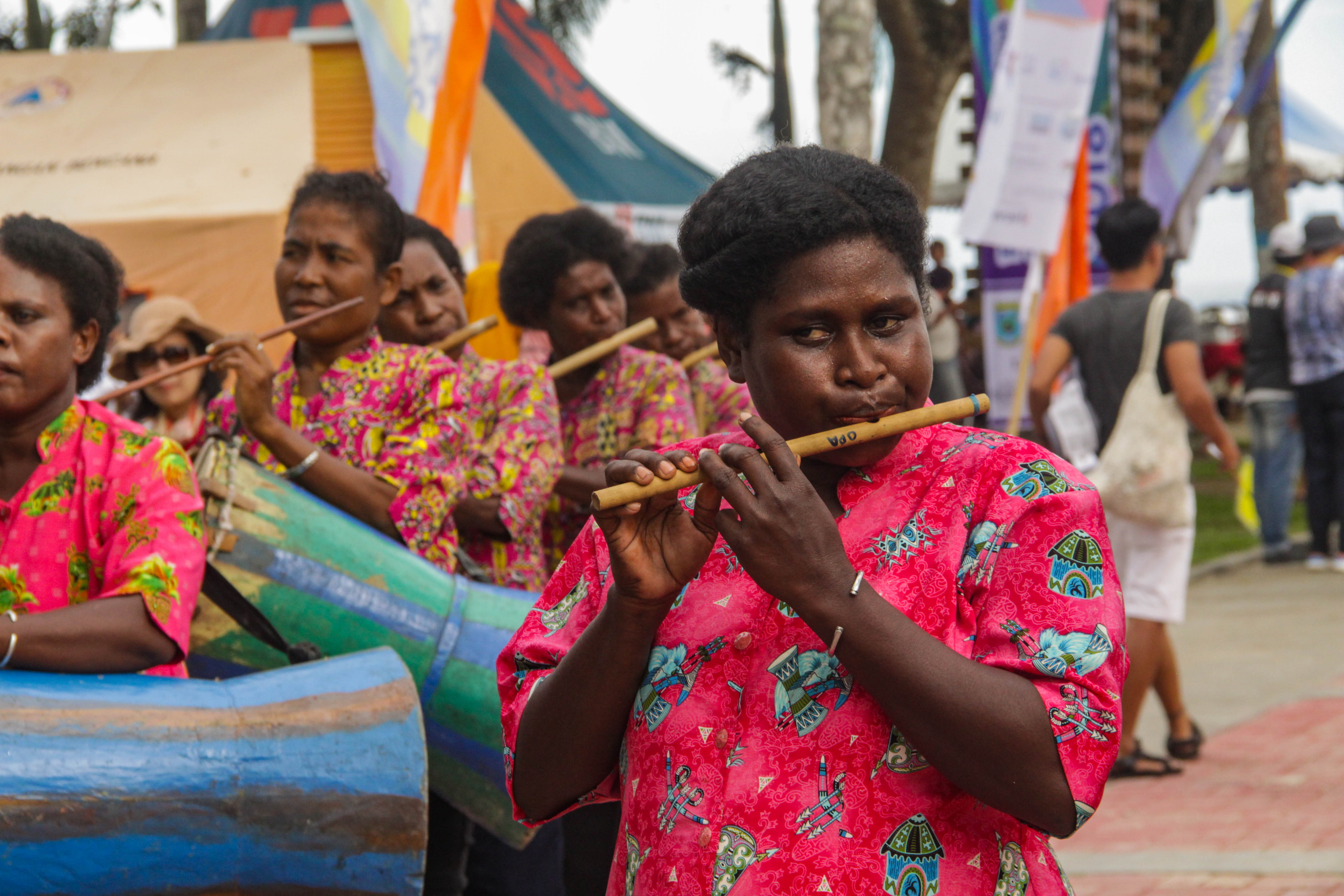
Suling (flute)

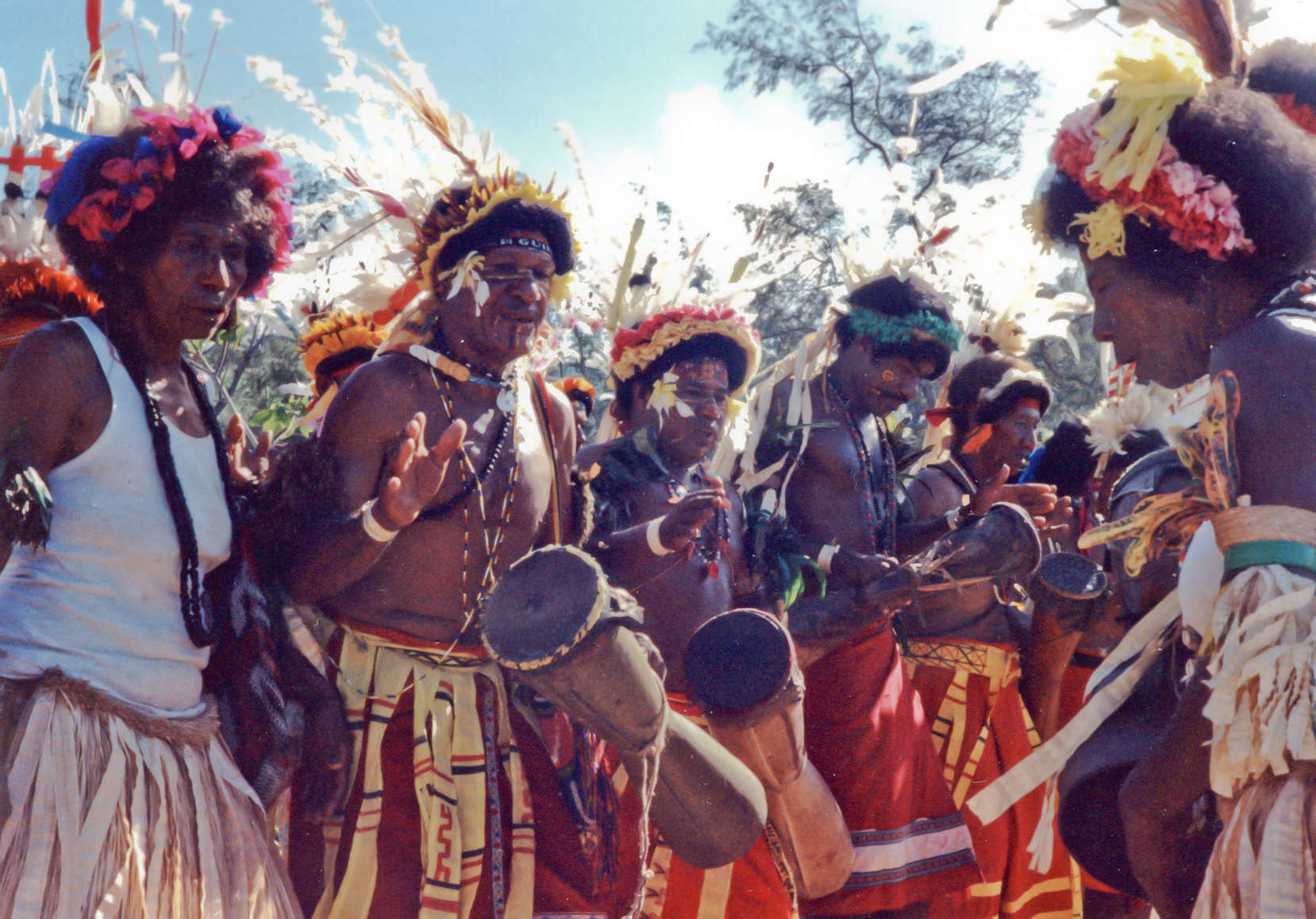
Kundu drummers

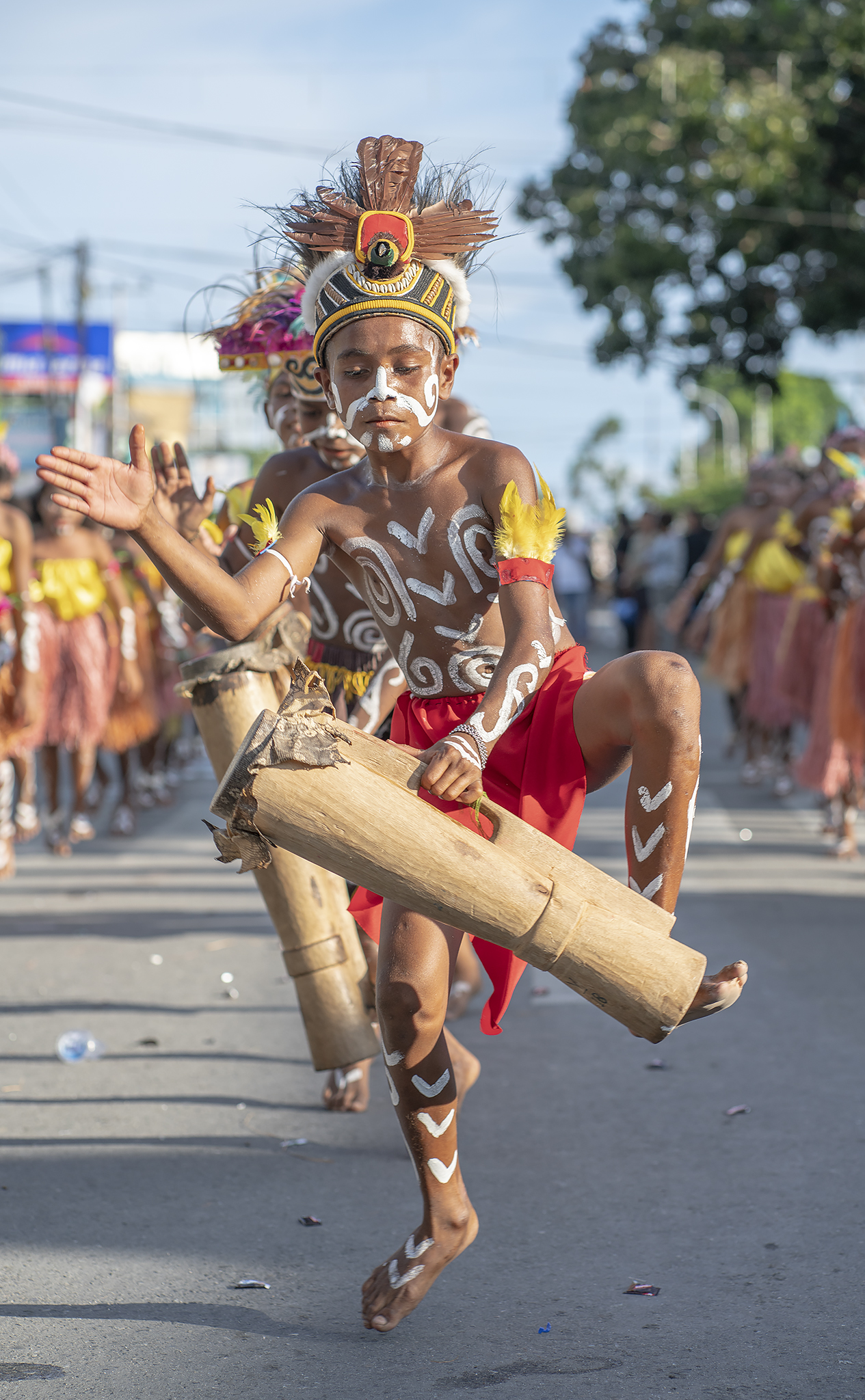
Tifa drum

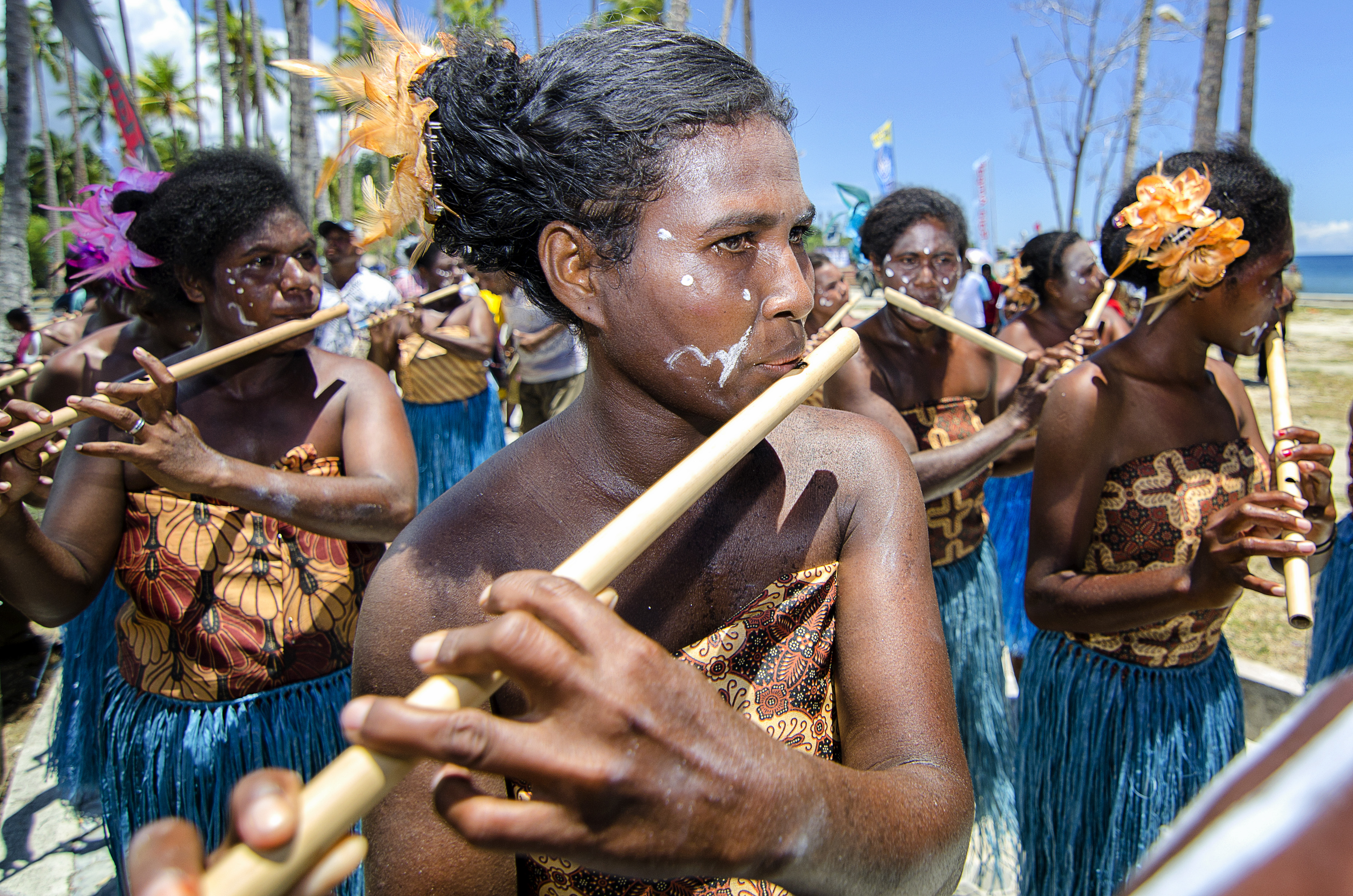
Suling (flute) player of the Raja Ampat Islands, off the western end of New Guinea.

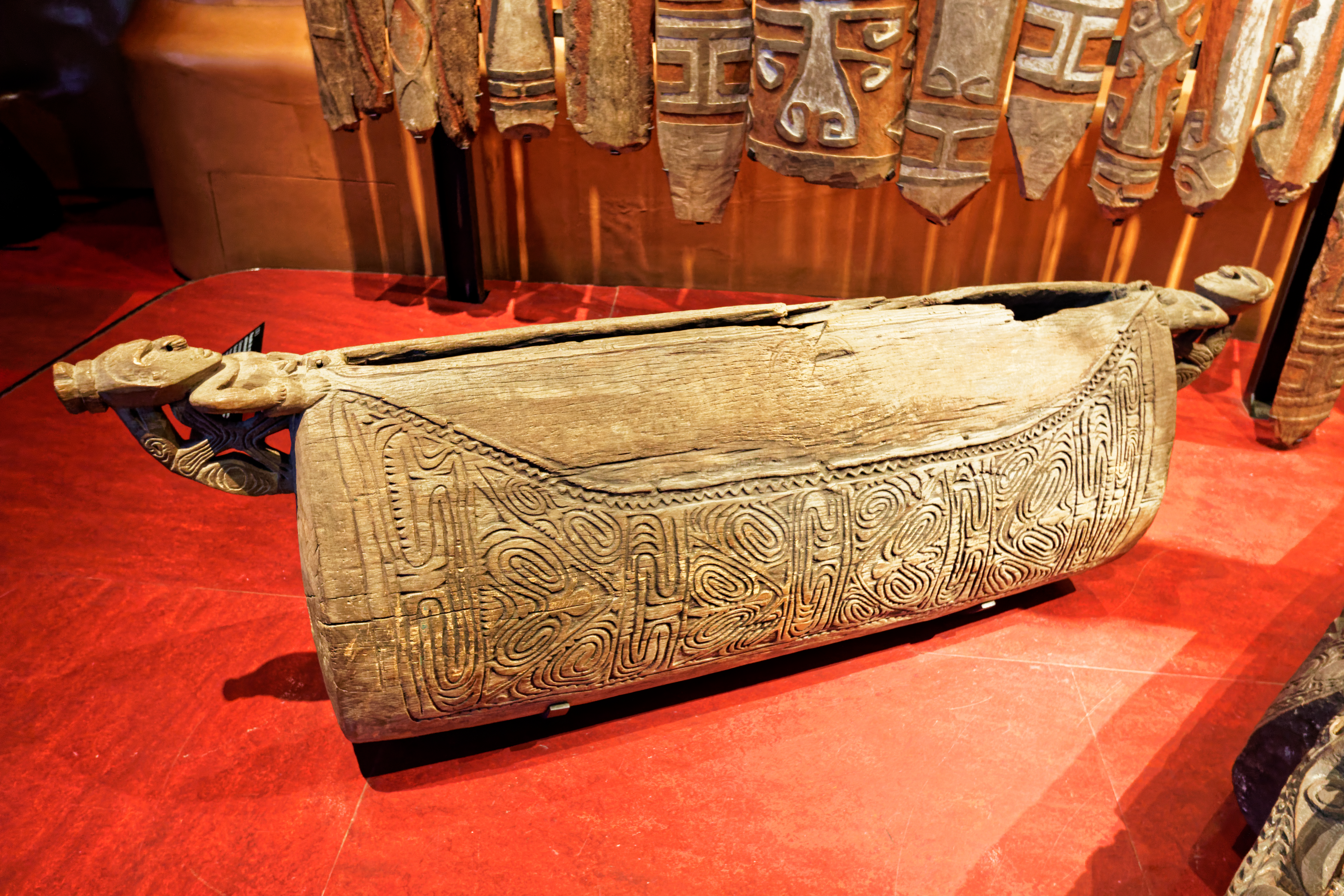
Garamut slit drum

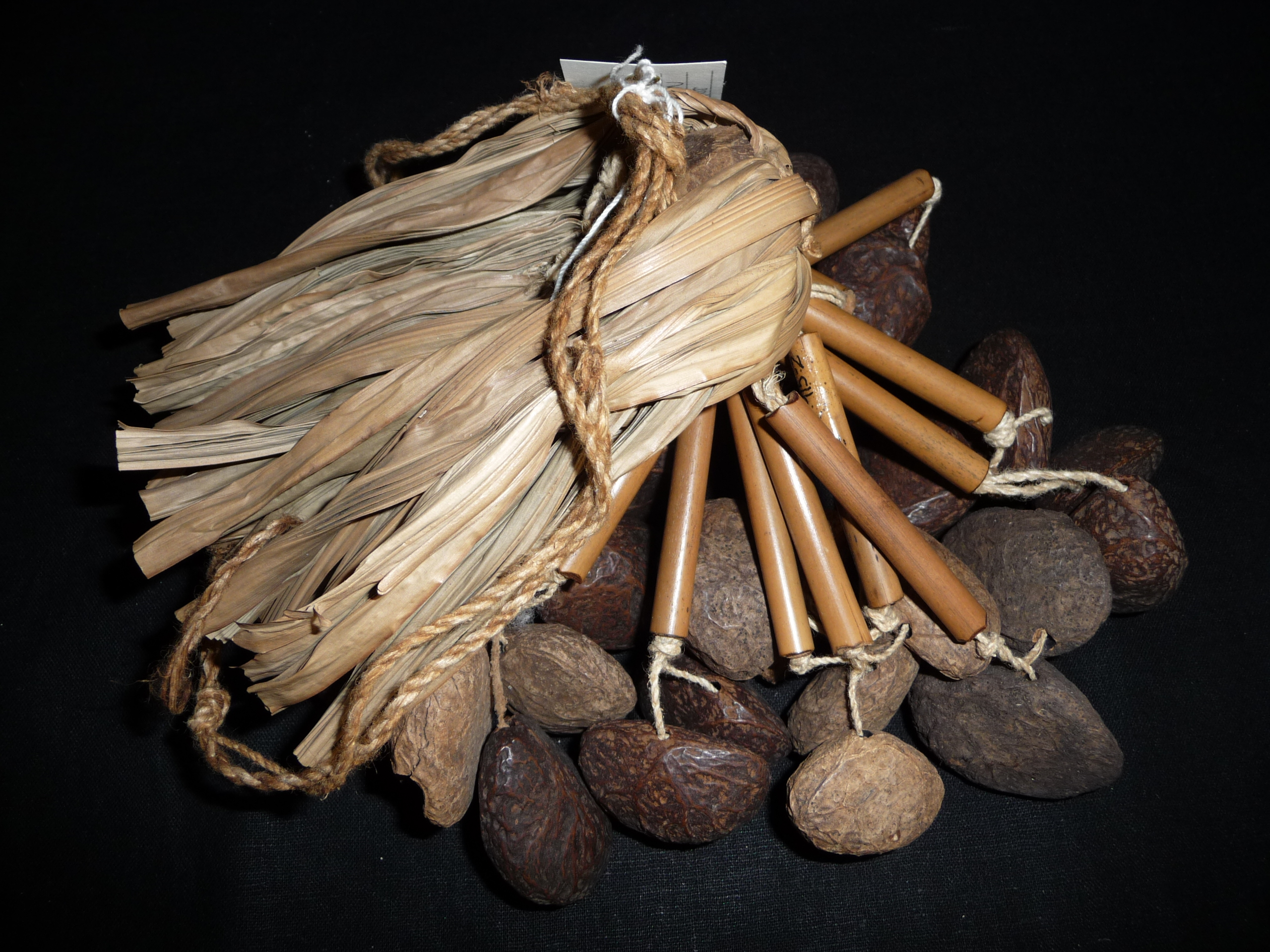
A dance rattle from East Sepik Province in Papua New Guinea. Rattles like these may form part of traditional dress, tied to the ankles of people dancing in traditional ‘singsings’

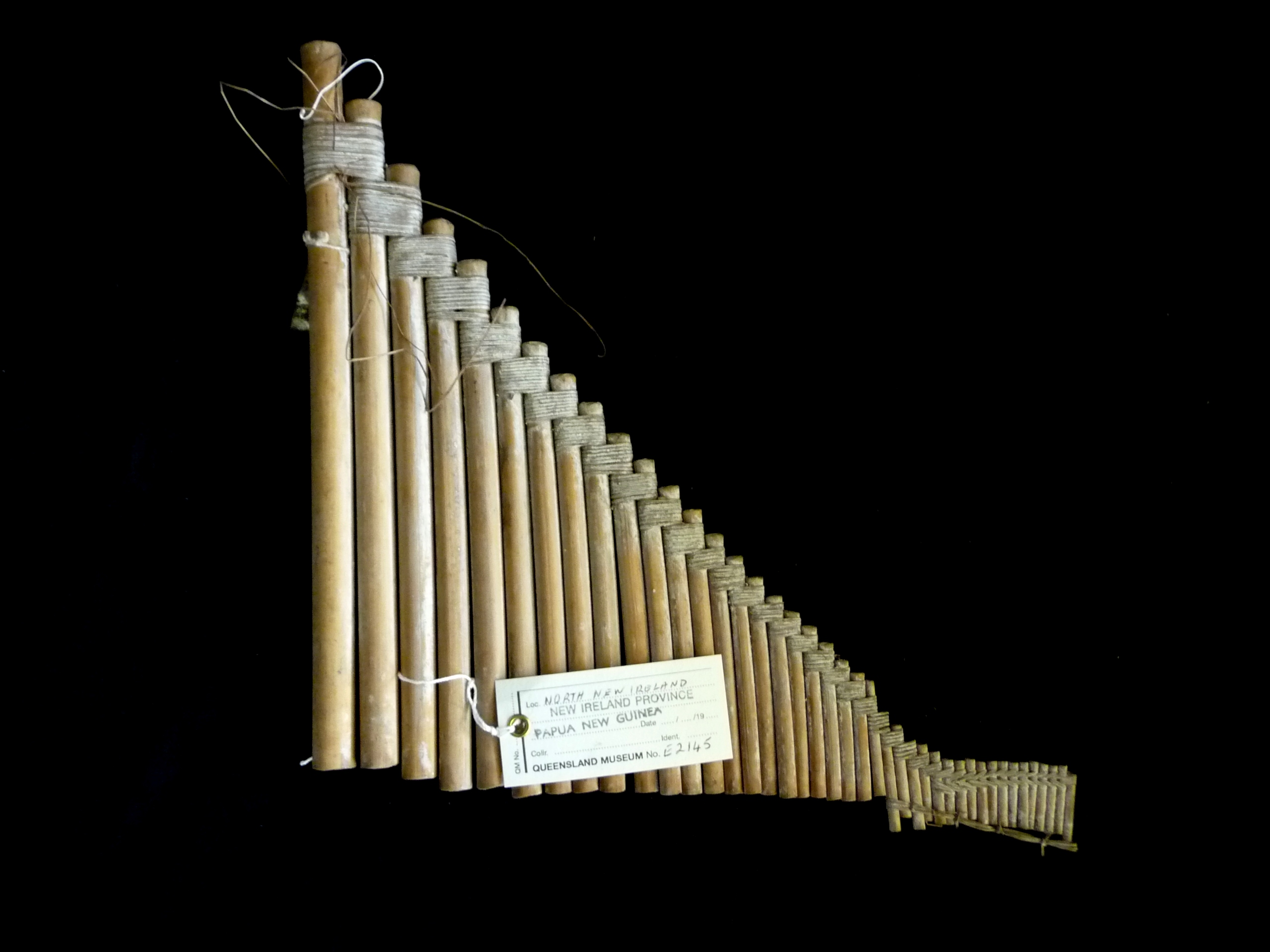
Wooden pipes made of thin bamboo are used for music making and ceremonies. New Ireland Province.

== Pop music ==
Song of the "Ujangong" mask dance
Wax cylinder recording from German New Guinea on August 23, 1904, recorded by German anthropologist Rudolf Pöch.

By the beginning of the 20th century, Christian hymns, work songs and gold rush songs were popular, some in native languages and some in English or German. By the 1920s, recorded music had become popular and radio broadcasting of western popular music appeared by the late 1930s. A few years later, Allied soldiers and sailors during World War II popularized the guitar and ukulele while stationed in the Philippines and Hawaii. String bands became very popular by the early 1950s, and soon dominated the pop landscape. In the late 1960s, rock bands like the Kopikats had appeared in cities, while string bands like the Paramana Strangers had become well known internationally. This was followed by the importation of bamboo bands, a style of music from the Solomon Islands using bamboo tubes played by hitting them with sandals. It first arrived in the area of Madang in the mid-1970s, and soon spread throughout the country.

== Reggae music ==
Anslom Nakikus is a leading figure in Papua New Guinean reggae.

== Hip hop/rap ==
O-Shen was one of the first to blend hip hop with reggae. The culture soon spread as many local underground talents surfaced, such as Naka Blood with their first hit "Pom Pom City" followed by "Time is Now". Another group surfaced later by the name of 3KiiNgZ, taking Papua New Guinea by storm with the hits "High Groove Theory", "Kanaka Walk", and "One Sound" (featuring Sprigga Mek from the hip hop collective Naka Blood.) Sprigga Mek of Naka Blood went solo and released "Sweet Mekeo", rapping in his local Mekeo dialect, and later released "Pasin Kanak;" this is now known as the unofficial national anthem of the Papua New Guinea Kanakas. Papua Gong Native with his Kanaka rhyming skills is one of the best-known local rappers rapping in Motu dialect. As the 21st century progressed, technology and influence from the outside world caused an exponential growth of recording artists and 'Pacific-style' music. Artists such as Wild Pack (Tasik Yard), Daniel Bilip, Ragga Siai, Tarvin Toune, Saii Kay and Tonton Malele began to create their own mixture of modern and traditional music sung in Tok Pidgin, English and local tribal languages. This style of music by these popular artists now dominate music scene in PNG.

== Papua New Guinea musicians ==
- Anslom Nakikus
- O-Shen
- Kande Dwayne
- Maltech Citizen Boyz
- Tasik Yard (Wild Pack)
- Ragga Siai
- Tarvin Toune
- Saii Kay
- Uralom Kania
- Sir Lister Serum
- Gedix Atege
- Archie Tarzy
- Mal Meninga Kuri
- Augustine Emil
- K-Mala
- Daniel Bilip
- Kronos
- Mereani Masani
- Danielle PNG Official (Danielle Morgan)
