= Sakiusa Bulicokocoko =

Fijian musician (1950/1951–2007)

- Born: 1950 or 1951; Namara, Tailevu, Fiji
- Died: August 2007 Hawaii

Sakiusa Bulicokocoko (born 1950 or 1951 in Namara, Tailevu, Fiji; died August 2007 in Hawaii) was a Fijian musician.

The Fiji Times described him as a "legendary musician [...] whose rendition of Fijian classics such as "Veibogi kece", "Lewa lei lewa" and "Isa Lei" endeared him to many generations". The government of the Solomon Islands has referred to him as "Fiji's most famous entertainer and musician", and credits him with turning Solomon Islands' "national song" "Walkabout long Chinatown" into an "international hit" by "transform[ing] it from a laid-back island country tune to a rock-and-roll number".

Bulicokocoko was partially blind.
