= Edwin Nanau Sitori =

Solomon Islands composer and singer (born 1930s)

Edwin Nanau Sitori, also known as Eddie Sitori (born in the mid-1930s in Onepusu, Malaita), is a Solomon Islands former amateur composer and singer, best known for composing the country's unofficial "national song", "Walkabout long Chinatown".

In the 1950s, he worked as an electrician at the Honiara Power House, which provided electricity to Honiara. It was there that he composed the song, with Rone Naqu and Jason Que. He also sang and played the guitar in several bands during the 1950s and 60s. From the 1960s to the 1980s, he worked at sea as a shipboard electrician, before working once more as an electrician on land.
