= Allan Natachee =

Papua New Guinean poet

Allan Natachee (born Avaisa Pirongo) was a poet from Papua New Guinea. The first Papuan poet in print, he is also sometimes referred to as the 'Papuan Poet Laureate'.

== Life and career ==
Natachee was born Avaisa Pirongo in July 1924. He described his father as a "peace chief" and his mother as the "daughter of a warrior," however, he was primarily raised by Catholic nuns who renamed him Allan Natachee.

As an early adult, Natachee worked in broadcasting and would visit various villages recording their poetry. This love of poetry was discovered by Percy Cochrane, who worked with him in Konedobu and helped him publish his poetry in Oceania. His first published work there was "Makeo Poems and Legends" in the December 1951 issue. This publication of his work was especially significant because it was the first English-language poetry published by a black Papua New Guinean. It would be almost twenty years before the next poet was published in the English language.

A selection of his poetry was published as part of the series Papua Pocket Poets. He also saw his poems published in the Journal of the Public Service and the South Pacific Post. Over the course of his life, Natachee translated hundreds of traditional poems into English.

In 1983, Natachee was poet-in-residence at the University of Papua New Guinea. He was named the "Poet Laurete of Papua" by a Philippines-based group, the United Poets Laurete International, who awarded him a wreath of silver leaves and named him a "Distinguished Poet of Papua."

== Reception ==
Much of Natachee's early work was targeted at an Australian audience and was broadcast on Australian Broadcasting Corporation wavelengths, often taking a dismissive tone towards Papuan culture and praising the United Kingdom. These works were criticized by Ulli Beier, who described him as a "pilot poet" and his work as "helplessly hanging between two worlds." Other contemporary reviews of his work were more positive, with Kirpal Singh describing Natachee's adherence to metre and saying that his poems encompassed "both tradition and ingenuity."
