= Anslom Nakikus =

Papua New Guinean singer

Anslom Nakikus is a Papua New Guinean singer. He has been described by Solomon Islands' leading newspaper Solomon Times as "the popular singing sensation of Papua New Guinea".

Reggae is dominant in his music.

He has produced three albums to date. His second album, produced with Mangrove Productions, is entitled Fool Moon.

Anslom's new album set to be released this year 2024, sees him collaborate with Jamaican reggae legend Chaka Demus with the song called “Make Me Smile” and is expected to be a massive world-wide hit and chart highly the world over. Anslom also collaborates with multi-instrumentalist and producer Ashton Barret Jnr of legendary Bob Marley & The Wailers under the supervision of booking agent Don Hines.

His work has been featured in that of domestic and foreign artists, such as PNG's Leonard Kania's "Queen 4 lane", X-vibes' "Teharoa", Kuakumba's "Leaving Me Lonely", Solomon Islander Sharzy's "Hem Stret", New Caledonian Fedyz's "Noumea", and Fijian Lia Osbourne's "Ain't No Sunshine".

He has been Rabaul Band's Barike lead vocalist since Kanai Pineri left, and sings for Barike in the album Frek Tasol. He is of Barike descent.

== Discography ==
- Don't You Lie (1999)
- Aross (2001)
- Bongbong (2002)
- Crazy Best of Anslom (2007)
- Fool Moon (2008)
- Pee N Gee (2014)
- Love Me Again (2019)
