= Walkabout long Chinatown =

1950s Solomon Islands folksong in Pijin

Song
- Language: Pijin
- Written: 1950s
- Genre: Folk
- Songwriters: Edwin Nanau Sitori; Rone Naqu; Jason Que

"Walkabout long Chinatown" (or "Wakabauti long Chinatown", or "Wakabaot Long Saenataon") is a folksong from Solomon Islands. The government of Solomon Islands describes it as "the national song of not only Solomon Islands, but also of Melanesia" as a whole.

The song was composed in the 1950s, in the Pijin language of Solomon Islands, by Edwin Nanau Sitori, Rone Naqu and Jason Que. Subsequently recorded and aired by the Solomon Islands Broadcasting Service, it "immediately became popular"; its popularity was increased when it was recorded by Solomon Dakei, and sung to Prince Philip, Duke of Edinburgh during the Duke's visit to the country in 1958. It then "became an international hit when Fiji's most famous entertainer and musician [...] Sakiusa Bulicokocoko transformed it from a laid-back island country tune to a rock-and-roll number". It can now "be heard all across the Pacific Islands region", and is considered "a classic in the Pacific". It was notably sung in 2010 by Victor Ngele, Solomon Islands Ambassador to the Republic of China (Taiwan), at the conclusion of the Taiwan Study Camp for Future Leaders from Pacific Allies in Taipei.

The song refers to the Chinatown in Honiara, the capital city of Solomon Islands. After the Second World War, at a time when Honiara was barely a small town, young men would -according to the song- cross Honiara's Chinatown on their way to hospital staff's accommodation on the far end of the town, hoping to meet nurses there. Thus the song "is about romance sought, won, lost or just wished".

The song and its title have, at times, inspired academic works, such as M. Bellam's "Walkabout long Chinatown: Aspects of urban and regional development in the British Solomon Islands" (1969), or Clive Moore's "No More Walkabout Long Chinatown: Asian Involvement in the Solomon Islands' Economic and Political Processes" (2007).
