= Blasius To Una =

Papua New Guinean musician

Blasius To Una Turtavu (born 2 February 1925, date of death unknown) was a Papua New Guinean musician. He composed hymns in his language Kuanua. He has been described as "probably the first Papua New Guinean music personality to receive attention from a wide public".

== Biography ==
Blasius was born on 2 February 1925, in the Paparatawa village in the Kokopo sub-province of East New Britain. Two months after he was born, his mother died, and his father, a Catholic priest, took him to Vunapope Convent. Blasius was raised by his sisters. In 1933, he was sent to Milmila Catholic Mission in the Duke of York Islands, where he attended primary school until 1938. He then returned to Vunapope and lived with his father until 1941. He was in Vunapope when the Japanese Army invaded New Britain, and in 1942, he was unwillingly recruited by the Japanese as an interpreter. During this time, he had to teach Japanese soldiers Melanesian Pidgin and Kuanua (the Tolai language). Towards the end of the war, suspected of sympathy towards the allied American and Australian armies, he was jailed and condemned to death by the Japanese, but was eventually freed by an American pilot. Blasius was happy when the war ended, and after a few months recovering from a leg injury, started working at the Nonga Military Hospital, becoming a doctor's driver in 1947. He later worked with the Department of Transport in Rabaul.

He first started playing guitar in 1946, borrowing it from a brother-in-law for 5 shillings. At this time, his salary was very low and he could not afford to buy his own instrument. Nevertheless, later in the year he managed to buy himself a ukulele, and started his musical career. His first composition in 1949, was a series of four hymns. Then, he composed regularly, not only hymns, but also High Masses, ballads in his own Kuanua tongue, and satirical songs in Pidgin. Blasius To Una was very popular in the Gazelle Peninsula, but found fame all over Papua New Guinea, particularly amongst speakers of Pidgin. He was a regular participant of the Tolai Warwagira Festival, held annually in Rabaul, and took part in the Port Moresby Arts Festival in 1974. He also performed at numerous social occasions in his home province.

His imagination and ingenuity was recognised amongst the Tolai people of East New Britain, and he was often commissioned to compose songs for a particular occasion or purpose. Two of his songs that were commissioned for this purpose were "A Umana Beo", written for the women of the Kabaira Vocational Centre, and "Iau Lus Man Takodo", written in June 1977 for a leader of the village of Nodup where Blasius latterly lived. Individuals and community groups would sometimes commission songs from him for traditional occasions, with some preferring his music to the orthodox Tolai music. At 53, Blasius was still actively making music. He is deceased.
