= Music of Melanesia =

Various musical traditions found across the vast region of Melanesia

Melanesian music refers to the various musical traditions found across the vast region of Melanesia.

Vocal music is very common across Melanesia; sitting dances are also attested. Hand gestures are an important part of many songs, and most traditional music is dance music.

Wax cylinder recording from German New Guinea on August 23, 1904, recorded by German anthropologist Rudolf Pöch.

Folk instruments include various kinds of drums and slit-log gongs, flutes, panpipes, stamping tubes, rattles, among others. Occasionally, European guitars and ukuleles are also used.

== See also ==
- Melanesia
