= Sharzy =

Solomon Islander musician

Samson "Sammy" Saeni (a.k.a. Sharzy) is a musician from Solomon Islands.

Sharzy was born on the island of Simbo in the Western Province. His mother is from Simbo and his father from Malaita. His musical career began in 1995 when he joined the 2-4-1 band. He produced his first solo album Aloha in 2001, which became an instant hit. Since then he has released Aelan feel'n (2003), Aelan Wei (Pijin for "island way") (2008), Hem Stret (2008), Yumi Flo (2009) and Iu Mi Flow (2010). He sings in many languages including Simbo, Roviana, and Solomon Islands Pijin. He also has tracks in Tok Pisin and English.

His early songs were mostly love songs, but he described his fifth album, released in May 2008, as different: "My fifth album has a different taste [...] because I sing about things that happen in life."

Sharzy performed during the official launching of the Melanesian Spearhead Group Trade Directory on May 28, 2008. He sang the official summit theme song, "One People, Many Cultures".

He has been described by The Guardian as one of the Solomon Islands' "living national icons".
